= Iraq and weapons of mass destruction =

Iraq actively researched weapons of mass destruction (WMD) and used chemical weapons from 1962 to 1991, after which its chemical weapons stockpile was destroyed and its nuclear weapons program and its biological weapon program halted, in accordance with the United Nations Security Council's Resolution 687. The Iraqi government of Saddam Hussein was internationally condemned for its chemical attacks against Iranian and Iraqi Kurdish civilians and troops during the Iran–Iraq War. Saddam pursued extensive biological and nuclear weapons programs, but did not construct a nuclear weapon. After the Gulf War, the United Nations Special Commission located, confiscated, and destroyed large quantities of Iraqi chemical weapons and infrastructure; Iraq ceased its chemical, biological and nuclear programs.

During the Iran–Iraq War, known Iraqi chemical weapons attacks between 1983 and 1988 were estimated to have caused 50,000 immediate casualties to Iranian troops. Civilians were also targeted; between 3,200 and 5,000 people were killed in the Halabja massacre. The attacks were led by Ali Hassan al-Majid, using mustard gas and nerve agents. In the Gulf War, US bombing and post-war demolition of Iraqi chemical weapons facilities, especially containing sarin and cyclosarin, were concluded to be the primary cause of Gulf War syndrome, experienced by over 40% of US veterans of the Gulf War.

False assertions by the US and UK that Iraq continued researching and stockpiling WMDs played a major role in the prelude to the Iraq War. The US and UK carried out the 1998 bombing of Iraq, allegedly targeting WMD facilities. Following the September 11 attacks, the US attempted to link Iraq to alleged WMD pursuits of the perpetrating terrorist group Al-Qaeda. UN inspections resumed between November 2002 and March 2003, under Resolution 1441, which demanded Iraq provide "immediate, unconditional and active cooperation" to UN and IAEA inspections. The US argued that Iraq's lack of cooperation was a breach of Resolution 1441, but failed to convince the UNSC to pass a new resolution authorizing the use of force. Despite this, the US asserted peaceful measures could not disarm Iraq and launched the invasion of Iraq in March 2003.

U.S.-led inspections later found that Iraq had ceased active WMD production and stockpiling. Some have argued the false WMD allegations were used as a deliberate pretext for war. Various unsubstantiated conjectures were put forward that the weapons might have been hidden or sent elsewhere. In July 2004, official U.S. and British reports concluded that spy agencies had "listened to unreliable sources," leading to "false or exaggerated allegations about an Iraqi arsenal."

Iraq signed the Geneva Protocol in 1931, the Nuclear Non-Proliferation Treaty in 1969, and the Biological Weapons Convention in 1972 but did not ratify it until June 11, 1991. Iraq ratified the Chemical Weapons Convention in January 2009, with its entry into force for Iraq coming a month later on February 12.

== History ==
=== Program development 1960s–1980s ===
Republic of Iraq
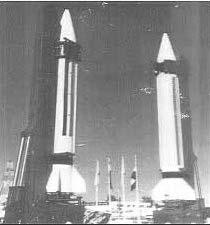
- The Iraqi-derived Scud missiles, ca. 1989.

- Location of Iraq
- Nuclear program start date: 1969; 57 years ago
- Nuclear program end date: 1991; 35 years ago (Resolution 687)
- First nuclear weapon test: None
- First thermonuclear weapon test: None
- Last nuclear test: None
- Largest yield test: None
- Total tests: None
- Peak stockpile: None
- Current stockpile: None (The program was infiltrated).
- Maximum missile range: al-Husayn; 644 kilometres (400 mi)
- Nuclear triad: No
- NPT party: Yes

1959 – August 17 USSR and Iraq signed an agreement for the USSR to build a nuclear power plant and established a nuclear program as part of their mutual understanding.

1968 – a Soviet supplied IRT-2000 research reactor together with a number of other facilities that could be used for radioisotope production was built close to Baghdad.

1975 – Saddam Hussein arrived in Moscow and asked about building an advanced model of an atomic power station. Moscow would approve only if the station was regulated by the International Atomic Energy Agency, but Iraq refused. However, an agreement of co-operation was signed on April 15, which superseded the one of 1959.

After 6 months France agreed to sell 72 kg of 93% uranium and built a nuclear power plant without IAEA control at a price of $3 billion.

Iraq began a clandestine nuclear weapons program under President Saddam Hussain's directives in late 1969. Iraq's weapons of mass destruction programs were assisted by a wide variety of foreign firms and governments in the 1970s and 1980s. As part of Project 922, Iraq built chemical weapons facilities such as laboratories, bunkers, an administrative building, and first production buildings in the early 1980s under the cover of a pesticide plant. German firms sent 1,027 tons of precursors of mustard gas, sarin, tabun, and tear gasses in all. This work allowed Iraq to produce 150 tons of mustard agent and 60 tons of Tabun in 1983 and 1984 respectively, continuing throughout the decade. Five other German firms supplied equipment to manufacture botulin toxin and mycotoxin for germ warfare. In 1988, German engineers presented centrifuge data that helped Iraq expand its nuclear weapons program. Laboratory equipment and other information was provided, involving many German engineers. All told, 52% of Iraq's international chemical weapon equipment was of German origin. The State Establishment for Pesticide Production (SEPP) ordered culture media and incubators from Germany's Water Engineering Trading.

Iraq used an overlooked method, electromagnetic separation (calutrons), to enrich uranium. Its interest in electromagnetic separation started sometime in 1971. Iraq chose to develop the electromagnetic process over more modern, economic, and efficient methods of enrichment because calutrons were easier to build, with fewer technical challenges, and the components required to build them were not subject to export controls.

==== United States ====
The United States supported Iraq during the Iran–Iraq war with over $500 million worth of dual-use equipment that were approved by the Commerce department. Among them were advanced computers, some of which were used in Iraq's nuclear program. The non-profit American Type Culture Collection and the Centers for Disease Control sold or sent biological samples of anthrax, West Nile virus and botulism to Iraq up until 1989, which Iraq claimed it needed for medical research. A number of these materials were used for Iraq's biological weapons research program, while others were used for vaccine development. For example, the Iraqi military settled on the American Type Culture Collection strain 14578 as the exclusive anthrax strain for use as a biological weapon, according to Charles Duelfer.

The United States government invited a delegation of Iraqi weapons scientists to an August 1989 "detonation conference" in Portland, Oregon. The U.S. Department of Defense and the U.S. Department of Energy conference featured experts that explained to the Iraqis and other attendees how to generate shock waves in any needed configuration. The conference included lectures on HMX, a powerful explosive generally preferred for nuclear detonation, and on flyer plates, which are devices for generating the specific type of shock waves necessary for nuclear bomb ignition. Both HMX and flyer plates were in fact later found at Iraqi nuclear research sites by United Nations weapons inspectors.

==== United Kingdom ====
In 1985, the Second Thatcher ministry allowed a German-owned and British-based company, Uhde Ltd, to construct a factory in Iraq which was intended to be used for mustard and nerve gas production by the Iraqis. During the late 1980s, the British government secretly granted Coventry-based engineering company Matrix Churchill permission to sell parts to Iraq for use in their weapons programs, while several UK firms sold components to Canadian engineer Gerald Bull for Project Babylon. In March 1990, a case of nuclear triggers bound for Iraq was seized by HM Customs and Excise at Heathrow Airport. The Scott Report uncovered much of the secrecy that had surrounded the "Arms-to-Iraq" affair, as it became known when knowledge of UK arm sales to Iraq became public.

Iraq's nuclear weapons program suffered a serious setback in 1981 when the Osiraq reactor, which would have been capable of breeding weapons-usable nuclear material, was bombed by the Israeli Air Force before it could be commissioned. David Albright and Mark Hibbs, writing for the Bulletin of the Atomic Scientists, disagree with this view, however. There were far too many technological challenges unsolved, they say.

=== Iran–Iraq War ===
In 1980, the U.S. Defense Intelligence Agency filed a report stating that Iraq had been actively acquiring chemical weapons capacities for several years, which later proved to be accurate. In November 1980, two months into the Iran–Iraq War, the first reported use of chemical weapons took place when Tehran radio reported a poison gas attack on Susangerd by Iraqi forces. The United Nations reported many similar attacks occurred the following year, leading Iran to develop and deploy a mustard gas capability. By 1984, Iraq was using poison gas with great effectiveness against Iranian "human wave" attacks. Chemical weapons were used extensively against Iran during the Iran–Iraq War. On January 14, 1991, the Defense Intelligence Agency said an Iraqi agent described, in medically accurate terms, military smallpox casualties he said he saw in 1985 or 1986. Two weeks later, the Armed Forces Medical Intelligence Center reported that eight of 69 Iraqi prisoners of war whose blood was tested showed an immunity to smallpox, which had not occurred naturally in Iraq since 1971; the same prisoners had also been inoculated for anthrax. The assumption being that Iraq used both smallpox and anthrax during this war.

The Washington Post reported that in 1984 the CIA secretly started providing intelligence to the Iraqi army during the Iran-Iraq War. This included information to target chemical weapons strikes. The same year it was confirmed beyond doubt by European doctors and UN expert missions that Iraq was employing chemical weapons against the Iranians. Most of these occurred during the Iran–Iraq War, but chemical weapons were used at least once against the Shia popular uprising in southern Iraq in 1991. Chemical weapons were used extensively, with post-war Iranian estimates stating that more than 100,000 Iranians were affected by Saddam Hussein's chemical weapons during the eight-year war with Iraq. Iran today is the world's second-most afflicted country by weapons of mass destruction, only after Japan. The official estimate does not include the civilian population contaminated in bordering towns or the children and relatives of veterans, many of whom have developed blood, lung and skin complications, according to the Organization for Veterans. Nerve gas agents killed about 20,000 Iranian soldiers immediately, according to official reports. Of the 90,000 survivors, some 5,000 seek medical treatment regularly and about 1,000 are still hospitalized with severe, chronic conditions. Many others were affected by mustard gas. There is deep resentment and anger in Iran that it was Western nations that helped Iraq develop and direct its chemical weapons arsenal in the first place and that the world did nothing to punish Iraq for its use of chemical weapons throughout the war. For example, the United States and the UK blocked condemnation of Iraq's known chemical weapons attacks at the UN Security Council. No resolution was passed during the war that specifically criticized Iraq's use of chemical weapons, despite the wishes of the majority to condemn this use. On March 21, 1986, the United Nation Security Council recognized that "chemical weapons on many occasions have been used by Iraqi forces against Iranian forces"; this statement was opposed by the United States, the sole country to vote against it in the Security Council (the UK abstained).

On March 23, 1988, western media sources reported from Halabja in Iraqi Kurdistan, that several days before Iraq had launched a large-scale chemical assault on the town. Later estimates were that 7,000 people had been killed and 20,000 wounded. The Halabja poison gas attack caused an international outcry against the Iraqis. Later that year the U.S. Senate proposed the Prevention of Genocide Act of 1988, cutting off all U.S. assistance to Iraq and stopping U.S. imports of Iraqi oil. The Reagan administration opposed the bill, calling it premature, and eventually prevented it from taking effect, partly due to a mistaken DIA assessment which blamed Iran for the attack. At the time of the attack the town was held by Iranian troops and Iraqi Kurdish guerrillas allied with Tehran. The Iraqis blamed the Halabja attack on Iranian forces. On August 21, 2006, the trial of Saddam Hussein and six codefendants, including Hassan al-Majid ("Chemical Ali"), opened on charges of genocide against the Kurds. While this trial does not cover the Halabja attack, it does cover attacks on other villages during the Iraqi "Anfal" operation alleged to have included bombing with chemical weapons.

==== Chemical weapon attacks ====
Location	Weapon Used	Date	Casualties
Haij Umran	Mustard	August 1983	fewer than 100 Iranian/Kurdish
Panjwin	Mustard	October–November 1983	3,001 Iranian/Kurdish
Majnoon Island	Mustard	February–March 1984	2,500 Iranians
al-Basrah	Tabun	March 1984	50–100 Iranians
Hawizah Marsh	Mustard & Tabun	March 1985	3,000 Iranians
al-Faw	Mustard & Tabun	February 1986	8,000 to 10,000 Iranians
Um ar-Rasas	Mustard	December 1986	1,000s Iranians
al-Basrah	Mustard & Tabun	April 1987	5,000 Iranians
Sumar/Mehran	Mustard & nerve agent	October 1987	3,000 Iranians
Halabjah	Mustard & nerve agent	March 1988	7,000s Kurdish/Iranian
al-Faw	Mustard & nerve agent	April 1988	1,000s Iranians
Fish Lake	Mustard & nerve agent	May 1988	100s or 1,000s Iranians
Majnoon Islands	Mustard & nerve agent	June 1988	100s or 1,000s Iranians
South-central border	Mustard & nerve agent	July 1988	100s or 1,000s Iranians
an-Najaf – Karbala area	Nerve agent & CS	March 1991	Unknown

(Source:)

=== 1991 Gulf War ===
On 2 August 1990, Iraq invaded Kuwait and was widely condemned internationally.

An international coalition of nations, led by the United States, liberated Kuwait in 1991.

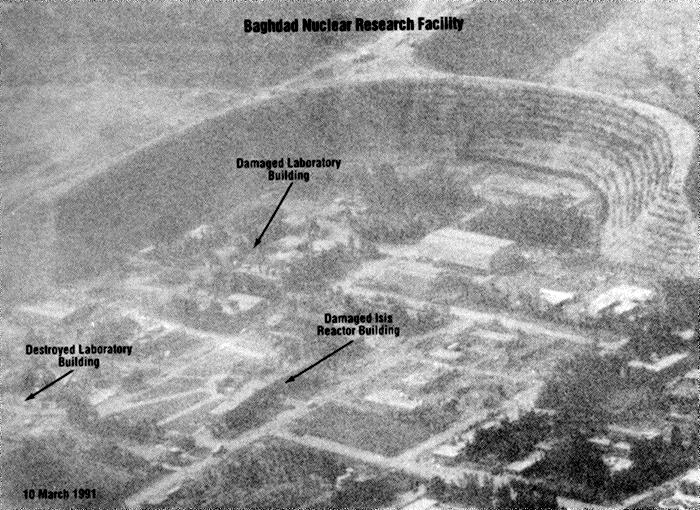
The Baghdad Nuclear Research Facility on 10 March 1991, after it was bombed by the U.S. in the Gulf War

In the terms of the UN ceasefire set out in Security Council Resolution 686, and in Resolution 687, Iraq was forbidden from developing, possessing or using chemical, biological and nuclear weapons by resolution 686. These binding resolutions also proscribed missiles with a range of more than 150 kilometres. The UN Special Commission on Iraq (UNSCOM) was created to carry out weapons inspections in Iraq, and the International Atomic Energy Agency (IAEA) was to verify the destruction of Iraq's nuclear program.

=== UN inspections ===
==== UNSCOM inspections 1991–1998 ====
The United Nations Special Commission on Iraq (UNSCOM) was set up after the 1990 invasion of Kuwait to inspect Iraqi weapons facilities. It was headed first by Rolf Ekéus and later by Richard Butler. During several visits to Iraq by UNSCOM, weapons inspectors interviewed British-educated Iraqi biologist Rihab Rashid Taha. According to a 1999 report from the U.S. Defense Intelligence Agency, the normally mild-mannered Taha exploded into violent rages whenever UNSCOM questioned her about al-Hakam, shouting, screaming and, on one occasion, smashing a chair, while insisting that al-Hakam was a chicken-feed plant. "There were a few things that were peculiar about this animal-feed production plant", Charles Duelfer, UNSCOM's deputy executive chairman, later told reporters, "beginning with the extensive air defenses surrounding it." The facility was destroyed by UNSCOM in 1996.

In 1995, UNSCOM's principal weapons inspector, Rod Barton from Australia, showed Taha documents obtained by UNSCOM that showed the Iraqi government had just purchased 10 tons of growth medium from a British company called Oxoid. Growth medium is a mixture of sugars, proteins and minerals that provides nutrients for microorganisms to grow. It can be used in hospitals and microbiology/molecular biology research laboratories. In hospitals, swabs from patients are placed in dishes containing growth medium for diagnostic purposes. Iraq's hospital consumption of growth medium was just 200 kg a year; yet in 1988, Iraq imported 39 tons of it. Shown this evidence by UNSCOM, Taha admitted to the inspectors that she had grown 19,000 litres of botulinum toxin; 8,000 litres of anthrax; 2,000 litres of aflatoxins, which can cause liver failure; Clostridium perfringens, a bacterium that can cause gas gangrene; and ricin. She also admitted conducting research into cholera, salmonella, foot and mouth disease, and camel pox, a disease that uses the same growth techniques as smallpox, but which is safer for researchers to work with. It was because of the discovery of Taha's work with camel pox that the U.S. and British intelligence services feared Saddam Hussein may have been planning to weaponize the smallpox virus. Iraq had a smallpox outbreak in 1971 and the Weapons Intelligence, Nonproliferation and Arms Control Center (WINPAC) believed the Iraqi government retained contaminated material.

The inspectors feared that Taha's team had experimented on human beings. During one inspection, they discovered two primate-sized inhalation chambers, one measuring 5 cubic meters, though there was no evidence the Iraqis had used large primates in their experiments. According to former weapons inspector Scott Ritter in his 1999 book Endgame: Solving the Iraq Crisis, UNSCOM learned that, between 1 July and 15 August 1995, 50 prisoners from the Abu Ghraib prison were transferred to a military post in al-Haditha, in the northwest of Iraq. Iraqi opposition groups say that scientists sprayed the prisoners with anthrax, though no evidence was produced to support these allegations. During one experiment, the inspectors were told, 12 prisoners were tied to posts while shells loaded with anthrax were blown up nearby. Ritter's team demanded to see documents from Abu Ghraib prison showing a prisoner count. Ritter writes that they discovered the records for July and August 1995 were missing. Asked to explain the missing documents, the Iraqi government charged that Ritter was working for the CIA and refused UNSCOM access to certain sites like Baath Party headquarters. Although Ekéus has said that he resisted attempts at such espionage, many allegations have since been made against the agency commission under Butler, charges which Butler has denied.

In April 1991 Iraq provided its first of what would be several declarations of its chemical weapons programs. Subsequent declarations submitted by Iraq in June 1992, March 1995 and June 1996 came only after pressure from UNSCOM. In February 1998, UNSCOM unanimously determined that after seven years of attempts to establish the extent of Iraq's chemical weapons programs, that Iraq had still not given the Commission sufficient information for them to conclude that Iraq had undertaken all the disarmament steps required by the UNSC resolutions concerning chemical weapons.

In August 1991 Iraq had declared to the UNSCOM biological inspection team that it did indeed have a biological weapons program but that it was for defensive purposes. Iraq then provided its first biological weapons declaration shortly after. After UNSCOM determined such declarations to be incomplete, more pressure was placed on Iraq to declare fully and completely. A second disclosure of the biological weapons came in March 1995. After UNSCOM's investigations and the discovery of inreffutable evidence, Iraq was forced to admit for the first time the existence of an offensive biological weapons program. But Iraq still denied weaponization. Further UNSCOM pressure resulted in a third prohibited biological weapons disclosure from Iraq in August 1995. Only after General Hussein Kamel al-Majid, Minister of Industry and Minerals and former Director of Iraq's Military Industrialization Corporation, with responsibility for all of Iraq's weapons programs, fled Iraq for Jordan, Iraq was forced to reveal that its biological warfare program was much more extensive than was previously admitted and that the program included weaponization. At this time, Iraq admitted that it had achieved the ability to produce longer-range missiles than had previously been admitted to. At this point, Iraq provides UNSCOM and IAEA with more documentation that turns out Hussein Kamel al-Majid had hidden on a chicken farm. These documents gave further revelation to Iraq's development of VX gas and its attempts to develop a nuclear weapon. More declarations would follow in June 1996 and September 1997. However, in April and July 1998, the biological weapons team and UNSCOM Executive Chairman assessed that Iraq's declarations were as yet "unverifiable" and "incomplete and inadequate", seven years after the first declarations were given in 1991.

In August 1998, Ritter resigned his position as UN weapons inspector and sharply criticized the Clinton administration and the UN Security Council for not being vigorous enough about insisting that Iraq's weapons of mass destruction be destroyed. Ritter also accused UN Secretary General Kofi Annan of assisting Iraqi efforts at impeding UNSCOM's work. "Iraq is not disarming", Ritter said on 27 August 1998, and in a second statement, "Iraq retains the capability to launch a chemical strike." In 1998 the UNSCOM weapons inspectors left Iraq. There is considerable debate about whether they were "withdrawn", "expelled" from the country by Iraqi officials (as alleged by George W. Bush in his "axis of evil" speech), or they chose to leave because they felt their hands were tied sufficiently to see the mission as hopeless. According to Butler himself in his book Saddam Defiant, it was U.S. Ambassador Peter Burleigh, acting on instructions from Washington, who suggested Butler pull his team from Iraq in order to protect them from the forthcoming U.S. and British airstrikes which eventually took place from December 16–19, 1998.

==== Between inspections: 1998–2003 ====
In August 1998 Scott Ritter remarked that, absent effective monitoring, Iraq could "reconstitute chemical biological weapons, long-range ballistic missiles to deliver these weapons, and even certain aspects of their nuclear weaponization program."

In June 1999, Ritter responded to an interviewer, saying: "When you ask the question, 'Does Iraq possess militarily viable biological or chemical weapons?' the answer is no! It is a resounding NO. Can Iraq produce today chemical weapons on a meaningful scale? No! Can Iraq produce biological weapons on a meaningful scale? No! Ballistic missiles? No! It is 'no' across the board. So from a qualitative standpoint, Iraq has been disarmed." Ritter later accused some UNSCOM personnel of spying, and he strongly criticized the Bill Clinton administration for misusing the commission's resources to eavesdrop on the Iraqi military. According to Ritter: "Iraq today (1999) possesses no meaningful weapons of mass destruction capability."

In June 2000, Ritter penned a piece for Arms Control Today entitled The Case for Iraq's Qualitative Disarmament. 2001 saw the theatrical release of his documentary on the UNSCOM weapons inspections in Iraq, In Shifting Sands: The Truth About Unscom and the Disarming of Iraq. The film was funded by an Iraqi-American businessman who, unknown to Ritter, had received Oil-for-Food coupons from the Iraqi administration.

In 2002, Scott Ritter stated that, by 1998, 90–95% of Iraq's nuclear, biological and chemical capabilities, and long-range ballistic missiles capable of delivering such weapons, had been verified as destroyed. Technical 100% verification was not possible, said Ritter, not because Iraq still had any hidden weapons, but because Iraq' had preemptively destroyed some stockpiles and claimed they had never existed. Many people were surprised by Ritter's turnaround in his view of Iraq during a period when no inspections were made.

During the 2002–2003 build-up to war, Ritter criticized the Bush administration and maintained that it had provided no credible evidence that Iraq had reconstituted a significant WMD capability. In an interview with Time in September 2002 Ritter said there were attempts to use UNSCOM for spying on Iraq. According to the New York Times and Washington Post media of Jan. 8, 1999, "In March [1998], in a last-ditch attempt to uncover Saddam Hussein's covert weapons and intelligence networks, the United States used the United Nations inspection team to send an American spy into Baghdad to install a highly sophisticated electronic eavesdropping system."

UNSCOM encountered various difficulties and a lack of cooperation from the Iraqi government. In 1998, UNSCOM was withdrawn at the request of the United States before Operation Desert Fox. Despite this, UNSCOM's own estimate was that 90–95% of Iraqi WMD had been successfully destroyed before its 1998 withdrawal. After that, for four years (from 1998 to 2002) Iraq remained without any outside weapons inspectors. During this time speculations arose that Iraq had actively resumed its WMD programs. In particular, various figures in the George W. Bush administration, as well as Congress, went so far as to express concern about nuclear weapons.

There is a dispute about whether Iraq still had WMD programs after 1998 and whether its cooperation with the United Nations Monitoring, Verification and Inspection Commission (UNMOVIC) was complete. Chief weapons inspector Hans Blix said in January 2003 that "access has been provided to all sites we have wanted to inspect" and Iraq had "cooperated rather well" in that regard, although "Iraq appears not to have come to a genuine acceptance of the disarmament." On March 7, in an address to the Security Council, Hans Blix stated: "Against this background, the question is now asked whether Iraq has cooperated "immediately, unconditionally and actively" with UNMOVIC, as is required under paragraph 9 of resolution 1441 (2002)... while the numerous initiatives, which are now taken by the Iraqi side with a view to resolving some long-standing open disarmament issues, can be seen as "active", or even "proactive", these initiatives 3–4 months into the new resolution cannot be said to constitute "immediate" cooperation. Nor do they necessarily cover all areas of relevance." Some U.S. officials understood this contradictory statement as a declaration of noncompliance.

There were no weapon inspections in Iraq for nearly four years after the UN departed from Iraq in 1998, and Iraq asserted that they would never be invited back. In addition, Saddam had issued a "secret order" that Iraq did not have to abide by any UN Resolution since in his view "the United States had broken international law".

In 2001, Saddam stated: "we are not at all seeking to build up weapons or look for the most harmful weapons . . . however, we will never hesitate to possess the weapons to defend Iraq and the Arab nation". The International Institute for Strategic Studies (IISS) in Britain published in September 2002 a review of Iraq's military capability, and concluded that Iraq could assemble nuclear weapons within months if fissile material from foreign sources were obtained. However, IISS also concluded that without such foreign sources, it would take years at a bare minimum.

Dr. Mahdi Obeidi, who created Saddam's nuclear centrifuge program that had successfully enriched uranium to weapons grade before the 1991 Gulf War, stated in an op-ed in The New York Times that although Iraqi scientists possessed the knowledge to restart the nuclear program, by 2002 the idea had become "a vague dream from another era."

=== Iraq War ===
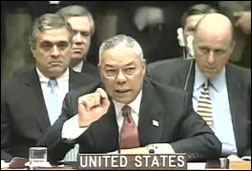
February 5, 2003 – United States Secretary of State Colin Powell holding a model vial of anthrax while giving the presentation to the United Nations Security Council

Possession of WMD was cited by the United States as the primary motivation instigating the Iraq War.

==== Prelude ====
In late 2002 Saddam Hussein, in a letter to Hans Blix, invited UN weapons inspectors back into the country. Subsequently, United Nations Security Council Resolution 1441 was issued, authorizing new inspections in Iraq. The United States claimed that Iraq's latest weapons declaration left materials and munitions unaccounted for; the Iraqis claimed that all such material had been destroyed, something which had been stated years earlier by Iraq's highest-ranking defector, Hussein Kamel al-Majid. According to reports from the previous UN inspection agency, UNSCOM, Iraq produced 600 metric tons of chemical agents, including mustard gas, VX and sarin; nearly 25,000 rockets and 15,000 artillery shells, with chemical agents, are still unaccounted for.

In January 2003, United Nations weapons inspectors reported that they had found no indication that Iraq possessed nuclear weapons or an active program. Some former UNSCOM inspectors disagree about whether the United States could know for certain whether or not Iraq had renewed production of weapons of mass destruction. Robert Gallucci said, "If Iraq had [uranium or plutonium], a fair assessment would be they could fabricate a nuclear weapon, and there is no reason for us to assume we would find out if they had." Similarly, former inspector Jonathan Tucker said, "Nobody really knows what Iraq has. You really can not tell from a satellite image what is going on inside a factory." However, Hans Blix said in late January 2003 that Iraq had "not genuinely accepted UN resolutions demanding that it disarm." He claimed there were some materials which had not been accounted for. Since sites had been found which evidenced the destruction of chemical weaponry, UNSCOM was actively working with Iraq on methods to ascertain for certain whether the amounts destroyed matched up with the amounts that Iraq had produced. In the next quarterly report, after the war, the total amount of proscribed items destroyed by UNMOVIC in Iraq can be gathered. Those include:

- 50 deployed Al-Samoud 2 missiles
- Various equipment, including vehicles, engines and warheads, related to the AS2 missiles
- 2 large propellant casting chambers
- 14 155 mm shells filled with mustard gas, the mustard gas totaling approximately 49 litres and still at high purity
- Approximately 500 ml of thiodiglycol
- Some 122 mm chemical warheads
- Some chemical equipment
- 224.6 kg of expired growth media

In an attempt to counter the allegations that some WMD arsenals (or capability) were indeed hidden from inspectors, Scott Ritter would argue later:

There's no doubt Iraq hasn't fully complied with its disarmament obligations as set forth by the Security Council in its resolution. But on the other hand, since 1998 Iraq has been fundamentally disarmed: 90–95% of Iraq's weapons of mass destruction capacity has been verifiably eliminated ... We have to remember that this missing 5–10% doesn't necessarily constitute a threat ... It constitutes bits and pieces of a weapons program which in its totality doesn't amount to much, but which is still prohibited ... We can't give Iraq a clean bill of health, therefore we can't close the book on their weapons of mass destruction. But simultaneously, we can't reasonably talk about Iraqi non-compliance as representing a de-facto retention of a prohibited capacity worthy of war.

Ritter also argued that the WMD Saddam had in his possession all those years ago, if retained, would have long since turned to harmless substances. He stated that Iraqi Sarin and tabun have a shelf life of approximately five years, VX lasts a bit longer (but not much longer), and finally he said botulinum toxin and liquid anthrax last about three years.

==== Legal justification ====
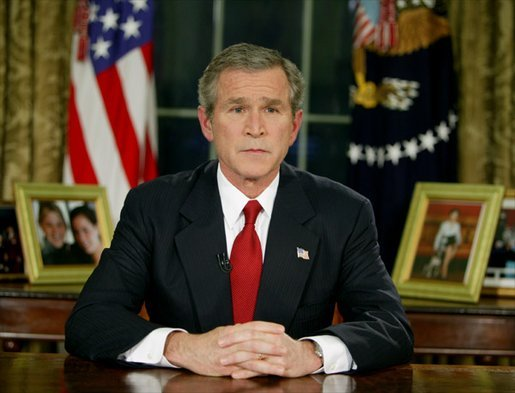
President George W. Bush addresses the nation from the Oval Office, March 19, 2003, to announce the beginning of Operation Iraqi Freedom. "The people of the United States and our friends and allies will not live at the mercy of an outlaw regime that threatens the peace with weapons of mass murder." The Senate committee found that many of the administration's pre-war statements about Iraqi WMD were not supported by the underlying intelligence.

On March 17, 2003, Lord Goldsmith, Attorney General of the UK, set out his government's legal justification for an invasion of Iraq. He said that Security Council resolution 678 authorised force against Iraq, which was suspended but not terminated by resolution 687, which imposed continuing obligations on Iraq to eliminate its weapons of mass destruction. A material breach of resolution 687 would revive the authority to use force under resolution 678. In resolution 1441 the Security Council determined that Iraq was in material breach of resolution 687 because it had not fully carried out its obligations to disarm. Although resolution 1441 had given Iraq a final chance to comply, UK Attorney General Goldsmith wrote "it is plain that Iraq has failed so to comply". Most member governments of the United Nations Security Council made clear that after resolution 1441 there still was no authorization for the use of force. Indeed, at the time 1441 was passed, both the U.S. and UK representatives stated explicitly that 1441 contained no provision for military action. Then-U.S. Ambassador John D. Negroponte was quoted as saying:

There's no "automaticity" and this is a two-stage process, and in that regard we have met the principal concerns that have been expressed for the resolution [...] Whatever violation there is, or is judged to exist, will be dealt with in the council, and the council will have an opportunity to consider the matter before any other action is taken.

The British ambassador to the UN, Sir Jeremy Greenstock, concurred:

We heard loud and clear during the negotiations the concerns about "automaticity" and "hidden triggers" – the concern that on a decision so crucial we should not rush into military action; that on a decision so crucial any Iraqi violations should be discussed by the Council. Let me be equally clear in response, as one of the co-sponsors of the text we have adopted: there is no "automaticity" in this Resolution.

The UN itself never had the chance to declare that Iraq had failed to take its "final opportunity" to comply as the U.S. invasion made it a moot point. American President George W. Bush stated that Saddam Hussein had 48 hours to step down and leave Iraq.

==== Coalition expanded intelligence ====
On 30 May 2003, Paul Wolfowitz stated in an interview with Vanity Fair magazine that the issue of weapons of mass destruction was the point of greatest agreement among Bush's team among the reasons to remove Saddam Hussein from power. He said, "The truth is that for reasons that have a lot to do with the U.S. government bureaucracy, we settled on the one issue that everyone could agree on, which was weapons of mass destruction as the core reason, but, there have always been three fundamental concerns. One is weapons of mass destruction, the second is support for terrorism, the third is the criminal treatment of the Iraqi people. Actually I guess you could say there's a fourth overriding one which is the connection between the first two."

In an interview with BBC in June 2004, David Kay, former head of the Iraq Survey Group, made the following comment: "Anyone out there holding – as I gather Prime Minister Blair has recently said – the prospect that, in fact, the Iraq Survey Group is going to unmask actual weapons of mass destruction, [is] really delusional."

In 2002, Scott Ritter, a former UNSCOM weapons inspector heavily criticized the Bush administration and media outlets for using the testimony of alleged former Iraqi nuclear scientist Khidir Hamza, who defected from Iraq in 1994, as a rationale for invading Iraq:

We seized the entire records of the Iraqi Nuclear program, especially the administrative records. We got a name of everybody, where they worked, what they did, and the top of the list, Saddam's "Bombmaker" [which was the title of Hamza's book, and earned the nickname afterwards] was a man named Jafar Dhia Jafar, not Khidir Hamza, and if you go down the list of the senior administrative personnel you will not find Hamza's name in there. In fact, we didn't find his name at all. Because in 1990, he didn't work for the Iraqi nuclear program. He had no knowledge of it because he worked as a kickback specialist for Hussein Kamel in the Presidential Palace.

He goes into northern Iraq and meets up with Ahmad Chalabi. He walks in and says, I'm Saddam's "Bombmaker". So they call the CIA and they say, "We know who you are, you're not Saddam's 'Bombmaker', go sell your story to someone else." And he was released, he was rejected by all intelligence services at the time, he's a fraud.

And here we are, someone who the CIA knows is a fraud, the US Government knows is a fraud, is allowed to sit in front of the United States Senate Committee on Foreign Relations and give testimony as an expert witness. I got a problem with that, I got a problem with the American media, and I've told them over and over and over again that this man is a documentable fraud, a fake, and yet they allow him to go on CNN, MSNBC, CNBC, and testify as if he actually knows what he is talking about.

On June 4, 2003, U.S. Senator Pat Roberts announced that the U.S. Select Committee on Intelligence that he chaired would, as a part of its ongoing oversight of the intelligence community, conduct a Review of intelligence on Iraqi weapons of mass destruction. On July 9, 2004, the Committee released the Senate Report of Pre-war Intelligence on Iraq. On July 17, 2003, the British Prime Minister Tony Blair said in an address to the U.S. Congress, that history would forgive the United States and United Kingdom, even if they were wrong about weapons of mass destruction. He still maintained that "with every fiber of instinct and conviction" Iraq did have weapons of mass destruction.

On February 3, 2004, British Foreign Secretary Jack Straw announced an independent inquiry, to be chaired by Lord Butler of Brockwell, to examine the reliability of British intelligence relating to alleged weapons of mass destruction in Iraq. The Butler Review was published July 14, 2004.

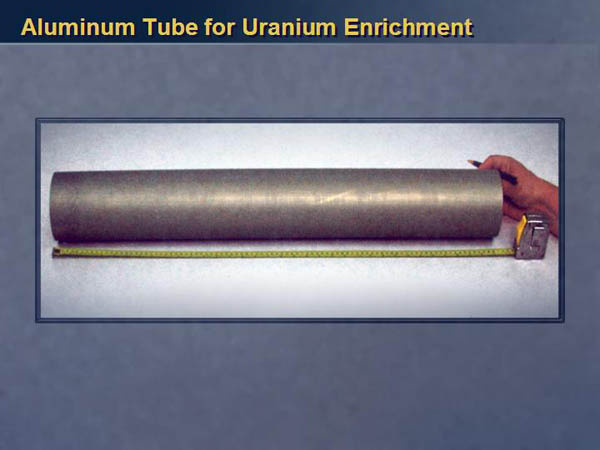
Presentation slide used by U.S. Secretary of State Colin Powell at the UN Security Council in the lead up to the 2003 invasion of Iraq

In the buildup to the 2003 war, The New York Times published a number of stories claiming to prove that Iraq possessed WMD. One story in particular, written by Judith Miller, helped persuade the American public that Iraq had WMD: in September 2002 she wrote about an intercepted shipment of aluminum tubes which the NYT said were to be used to develop nuclear material. It is now generally understood that they were not intended (or well suited) for that purpose but rather for artillery rockets. The story was followed up with television appearances by Colin Powell, Donald Rumsfeld and Condoleezza Rice all pointing to the story as part of the basis for taking military action against Iraq. Miller's sources were introduced to her by Ahmed Chalabi, an Iraqi exile favorable to a U.S. invasion of Iraq. Miller is also listed as a speaker for The Middle East Forum, an organization which openly declared support for an invasion. In May 2004 The New York Times published an editorial which stated that its journalism in the buildup to war had sometimes been lax. It appears that in the cases where Iraqi exiles were used for the stories about WMD were either ignorant as to the real status of Iraq's WMD or lied to journalists to achieve their own ends.

Despite the intelligence lapse, Bush stood by his decision to invade Iraq, stating:

But what wasn't wrong was Saddam Hussein had invaded a country, he had used weapons of mass destruction, he had the capability of making weapons of mass destruction, he was firing at our pilots. He was a state sponsor of terror. Removing Saddam Hussein was the right thing for world peace and the security of our country.

In a speech before the World Affairs Council of Charlotte, NC, on April 7, 2006, President Bush stated that he "fully understood that the intelligence was wrong, and [he was] just as disappointed as everybody else" when U.S. troops failed to find weapons of mass destruction in Iraq.

Intelligence shortly before the 2003 invasion of Iraq was heavily used as support arguments in favor of military intervention, with the October 2002 C.I.A. report on Iraqi WMD considered to be the most reliable one available at that time.

In June and September 2002, the British secret intelligence service (SIS) had intelligence from two independent sources that Iraq had expressed an interest in buying uranium from Niger.

"According to the CIA's report, all U.S. intelligence experts agree that Iraq is seeking nuclear weapons. There is little question that Saddam Hussein wants to develop nuclear weapons." Senator John Kerry (D-Mass.) – Congressional Record, October 9, 2002

On May 29, 2003, Andrew Gilligan appeared on the BBC's Today program early in the morning. He reported that the government "ordered (the September Dossier, a British Government dossier on WMD) to be sexed up, to be made more exciting, and ordered more facts to be...discovered."

On 27 May 2003, a secret US Defense Intelligence Agency fact-finding mission in Iraq reported unanimously to intelligence officials in Washington that two trailers captured in Iraq by Kurdish troops "had nothing to do with biological weapons." The trailers had been a key part of the argument for the 2003 invasion; Secretary of State Colin Powell had told the United Nations Security Council, "We have firsthand descriptions of biological weapons factories on wheels and on rails. We know what the fermenters look like. We know what the tanks, pumps, compressors and other parts look like." The Pentagon team had been sent to investigate the trailers after the invasion. The team of experts unanimously found "no connection to anything biological"; one of the experts told reporters that they privately called the trailers "the biggest sand toilets in the world." The report was classified, and the next day, the CIA publicly released the assessment of its Washington analysts that the trailers were "mobile biological weapons production." The White House continued to refer to the trailers as mobile biological laboratories throughout the year, and the Pentagon field report remained classified. It is still classified, but a Washington Post report of 12 April 2006, disclosed some of the details of the report. According to the Post:

A spokesman for the DIA asserted that the team's findings were neither ignored nor suppressed, but were incorporated in the work of the Iraqi Survey Group, which led the official search for Iraqi weapons of mass destruction. The survey group's final report in September 2004, 15 months after the technical report was written, noted the trailers were "impractical" for biological weapons production and were "almost certainly intended" for manufacturing hydrogen for weather balloons.

US General Tommy Franks was quoted as saying: "I think no one in this country probably was more surprised than I when weapons of mass destruction were not used against our troops as they moved toward Baghdad."

On 6 February 2004, U.S. President George W. Bush named an Iraq Intelligence Commission, chaired by Charles Robb and Laurence Silberman, to investigate U.S. intelligence, specifically regarding the 2003 invasion of Iraq and Iraq's weapons of mass destruction. On 8 February 2004, Hans Blix, in an interview on BBC TV, accused the U.S. and UK governments of dramatising the threat of weapons of mass destruction in Iraq, in order to strengthen the case for the 2003 war against the government of Saddam Hussein.

==== Iraq Survey Group ====
On May 30, 2003, the U.S. Department of Defense briefed the media that it was ready to formally begin the work of the Iraq Survey Group (ISG), a fact-finding mission from the coalition of the Iraq occupation into the WMD programs developed by Iraq, taking over from the British-American 75th Exploitation Task Force.

Various nuclear facilities, including the Baghdad Nuclear Research Facility and Tuwaitha Nuclear Research Center, were found looted in the month following the invasion. (Gellman, May 3, 2003) On June 20, 2003, the International Atomic Energy Agency reported that tons of uranium, as well as other radioactive materials such as thorium, had been recovered and that the vast majority had remained on site. There were several reports of radiation sickness in the area. It has been suggested that the documents and suspected weapons sites were looted and burned in Iraq by looters in the final days of the war.

On September 30, 2004, the U.S. Iraq Survey Group issued its Final Report. Among its key findings were:

1. "Saddam Husayn so dominated the Iraqi Regime that its strategic intent was his alone. He wanted to end sanctions while preserving the capability to reconstitute his weapons of mass destruction (WMD) when sanctions were lifted."
2. "Saddam wanted to recreate Iraq's WMD capability—which was essentially destroyed in 1991—after sanctions were removed and Iraq's economy stabilized, but probably with a different mix of capabilities to that which previously existed. Saddam aspired to develop a nuclear capability—in an incremental fashion, irrespective of international pressure and the resulting economic risks—but he intended to focus on ballistic missile and tactical chemical warfare (CW) capabilities;"
3. "Iran was the pre-eminent motivator of [Iraq's WMD] policy. All senior level Iraqi officials considered Iran to be Iraq's principal enemy in the region. The wish to balance Israel and acquire status and influence in the Arab world were also considerations, but secondary."
4. "The former Regime had no formal written strategy or plan for the revival of WMD after sanctions. Neither was there an identifiable group of WMD policy makers or planners separate from Saddam. Instead, his lieutenants understood WMD revival was his goal from their long association with Saddam and his infrequent, but firm, verbal comments and directions to them."
5. "Saddam did not consider the United States a natural adversary, as he did Iran and Israel, and he hoped that Iraq might again enjoy improved relations with the United States, according to Tariq 'Aziz and the presidential secretary."
6. Evidence of the maturity and significance of the pre-1991 Iraqi Nuclear Program but found that Iraq's ability to reconstitute a nuclear weapons program progressively decayed after that date;
7. Concealment of the nuclear program in its entirety, as with Iraq's BW program. Aggressive UN inspections after Desert Storm forced Saddam to admit the existence of the program and destroy or surrender components of the program;
8. After Desert Storm, Iraq concealed key elements of its program and preserved what it could of the professional capabilities of its nuclear scientific community;
9. "Saddam's primary goal from 1991 to 2003 was to have UN sanctions lifted, while maintaining the security of the Regime. He sought to balance the need to cooperate with UN inspections—to gain support for lifting sanctions—with his intention to preserve Iraq's intellectual capital for WMD with a minimum of foreign intrusiveness and loss of face. Indeed, this remained the goal to the end of the Regime, as the starting of any WMD program, conspicuous or otherwise, risked undoing the progress achieved in eroding sanctions and jeopardizing a political end to the embargo and international monitoring;"
10. A limited number of post-1995 activities would have aided the reconstitution of the nuclear weapons program once sanctions were lifted.

The report found that "The ISG has not found evidence that Saddam possessed WMD stocks in 2003, but [there is] the possibility that some weapons existed in Iraq, although not of a militarily significant capability." It also concluded that there was a possible intent to restart all banned weapons programs as soon as multilateral sanctions against it had been dropped, with Hussein pursuing WMD proliferation in the future: "There is an extensive, yet fragmentary and circumstantial, body of evidence suggesting that Saddam pursued a strategy to maintain a capability to return to WMD after sanctions were lifted..." No senior Iraqi official interviewed by the ISG believed that Saddam had forsaken WMD forever.

On October 6, 2004, the head of the Iraq Survey Group (ISG), Charles Duelfer, announced to the U.S. Senate Armed Services Committee that the group found no evidence that Iraq under Saddam Hussein had produced and stockpiled any weapons of mass destruction since 1991, when UN sanctions were imposed.

After he began cooperating with U.S. forces in Baghdad in 2003, Dr. Mahdi Obeidi, who ran Saddam's nuclear centrifuge program until 1997, handed over blueprints for a nuclear centrifuge along with some actual centrifuge components, stored at his home – buried in the front yard – awaiting orders from Baghdad to proceed. He said, "I had to maintain the program to the bitter end." In his book The Bomb in My Garden: The Secrets of Saddam's Nuclear Mastermind, the Iraqi nuclear engineer explains that his nuclear stash was the key that could have unlocked and restarted Saddam's bombmaking program. However, it would require a massive investment and a re-creation of thousands of centrifuges in order to reconstitute a full centrifugal enrichment program.

In a January 26, 2004, interview with Tom Brokaw of NBC news, Kay described Iraq's nuclear, chemical, and biological weapons programs as being in a "rudimentary" stage. He also stated that "What we did find, and as others are investigating it, we found a lot of terrorist groups and individuals that passed through Iraq." In responding to a question by Brokaw as to whether Iraq was a "gathering threat" as President Bush had asserted before the invasion, Kay answered:

Tom, an imminent threat is a political judgment. It's not a technical judgment. I think Baghdad was actually becoming more dangerous in the last two years than even we realized. Saddam was not controlling the society any longer. In the marketplace of terrorism and of WMD, Iraq well could have been that supplier if the war had not intervened.

In June 2004, the United States removed 2 tons of low-enriched uranium from Iraq, sufficient raw material for a single nuclear weapon.

Demetrius Perricos, then head of UNMOVIC, stated that the Kay report contained little information not already known by UNMOVIC. Many organizations, such as the journal Biosecurity and Bioterrorism, have claimed that Kay's report is a "worst case analysis".

==== Captured documents ====
Operation Iraqi Freedom documents refers to some 48,000 boxes of documents, audiotapes and videotapes that were captured by the U.S. military during the 2003 invasion of Iraq. Many of these documents seem to make clear that Saddam's regime had given up on seeking a WMD capability by the mid-1990s. Associated Press reported, "Repeatedly in the transcripts, Saddam and his lieutenants remind each other that Iraq destroyed its chemical and biological weapons in the early 1990s, and shut down those programs and the nuclear-bomb program, which had never produced a weapon." At one 1996 presidential meeting, top weapons program official Amer Mohammed Rashid describes his conversation with UN weapons inspector Rolf Ekeus: "We don't have anything to hide, so we're giving you all the details." At another meeting, Saddam told his deputies, "We cooperated with the resolutions 100 percent and you all know that, and the 5 percent they claim we have not executed could take them 10 years to (verify). Don't think for a minute that we still have WMD. We have nothing." U.S. Congressman Peter Hoekstra called for the U.S. government to put the remaining documents on the Internet so Arabic speakers around the world can help translate the documents.

==== Post-war discoveries and incidents ====
Since the 2003 invasion of Iraq, several reported finds of chemical weapons were announced, including half a dozen incidents during the invasion itself.

In April 2003, US Marines stumbled across a number of buildings which emitted unusual levels of radiation. Upon close inspection the troops uncovered "many, many drums" containing low-grade uranium, also known as yellowcake. According to an expert familiar with UN nuclear inspections, US troops had arrived at the Tuwaitha Nuclear Research Center and the material under investigation had been documented, stored in sealed containers and subject to supervision by the International Atomic Energy Agency since 1991. The material was transported out of Iraq in July 2008 and sold to Canadian uranium producer Cameco Corp., in a transaction described as worth "tens of millions of dollars."

A post-war case occurred on January 9, 2004, when Icelandic munitions experts and Danish military engineers discovered 36 120-mm mortar rounds containing liquid buried in Southern Iraq. While initial tests suggested that the rounds contained a blister agent, subsequent analysis by American and Danish experts showed that no chemical agent was present.

On May 2, 2004, a shell containing mustard gas was found in the middle of a street west of Baghdad. The Iraq Survey Group investigation reported that it had been previously "stored improperly", and thus the gas was "ineffective" as a useful chemical agent. Officials from the Defense Department commented that they were not certain if use was to be made of the device as a bomb.

On May 16, 2004, a 152 mm artillery shell was used as an improvised bomb. The shell exploded and two U.S. soldiers were treated for minor exposure to a nerve agent (nausea and dilated pupils). On May 18 it was reported by U.S. Department of Defense intelligence officials that tests showed the two-chambered shell contained the chemical agent sarin, the shell being "likely" to have contained three to four liters of the substance (in the form of its two unmixed precursor chemicals prior to the aforementioned explosion that had not effectively mixed them). Former U.S. weapons inspector David Kay told the Associated Press that "he doubted the shell or the nerve agent came from a hidden stockpile, although he didn't rule out that possibility." Kay also considered it possible that the shell was "an old relic overlooked when Saddam said he had destroyed such weapons in the mid-1990s." It is likely that the insurgents who planted the bomb did not know it contained sarin, according to Brig. Gen. Mark Kimmitt, and another U.S. official confirmed that the shell did not have the markings of a chemical agent. The Iraq Survey Group later concluded that the shell "probably originated with a batch that was stored in a Al Muthanna CW complex basement during the late 1980s for the purpose of leakage testing."

In a July 2, 2004, article published by The Associated Press and Fox News, it was reported that sarin gas warheads dating back to the last Iran–Iraq War were found in South Central Iraq by Polish Allies. The Polish troops secured munitions on June 23, 2004, but it turned out that the warheads did not in fact contain sarin gas but "were all empty and tested negative for any type of chemicals"—and it transpired that the Poles had bought the shells for $5,000 each.

In 2004, hundreds of chemical warheads were recovered from the desert close to the Iran–Iraq border. According to The Washington Post, the munitions "had been buried near the Iranian border, and then long forgotten, by Iraqi troops during their eight-year war with Iran". Officials did not consider the discovery as evidence of an ongoing weapons program that was believed to be in existence before the invasion began.

The Iraqi government informed the United Nations in 2014 that insurgents affiliated with the Islamic State terror group had seized control of the Muthana State Establishment, including a chemical weapons depot northwest of Baghdad. The facility was partially destroyed and placed under the supervision of UNSCOM following the 1991 Gulf War. It housed some 2,500 sarin-filled rockets at the time of their departure in 1999. The U.N. said that the munitions were of "poor quality" and "would largely be degraded after years of storage under the conditions existing there."

==== 2005: Operation Avarice ====
In 2005, the CIA collaborated with the Army Intelligence Corps in contacting an unnamed Iraqi individual who had knowledge and possession of remnant chemical weapon stockpiles and munitions in Iraq dating to its abandoned weapons program. Foreign materials exploitation specialists from the 203rd Military Intelligence Battalion as well as chemical specialists and ordnance disposal units were assigned the task of aiding the destruction of recovered weapons; ultimately, at least 400 Borak rockets were acquired and destroyed.

It is unknown how the individual acquired their stockpile. Many of the weapons were badly degraded and were empty or held nonlethal liquid, but some of the weapons analyzed indicated a concentration of nerve agents far higher than military intelligence had initially expected given their age, with the highest "agent purity of up to 25 percent for recovered unitary sarin weapons". At least once the undisclosed seller attempted to sell weapons with fake chemical components. In addition, he once "called the intel guys to tell them he was going to turn them over to the insurgents unless they picked them up."

==== 2006: House Armed Services Committee Hearing ====
On June 21, 2006, the United States House Permanent Select Committee on Intelligence released key points from a classified report provided to them by the National Ground Intelligence Center on the recovery of chemical weapons in Iraq. The declassified summary stated that "Since 2003, coalition forces have recovered approximately 500 weapons munitions which contain degraded mustard or sarin nerve agent", that chemical munitions "are assessed to still exist" and that they "could be sold on the black market". All weapons were thought to be manufactured in the 1980s and date to Iraq's war with Iran. The report prompted US Senator Rick Santorum to hold a press conference in which he declared "We have found weapons of mass destruction in Iraq."

During a House Armed Services Committee meeting convened to discuss the topic, the center's commander, Army Colonel John Chiu, elaborated that the munitions are "badly corroded in most cases [and] some were deliberately dismantled, if you will, to prevent them from being used." Nonetheless, in response to a question from committee member Rep. Curt Weldon (R-Pennsylvania), Col. Chui agreed that the munitions met the technical definition of weapons of mass destruction. "These are chemical weapons as defined under the Chemical Weapons Convention and yes, sir, they do constitute weapons of mass destruction." Weapons expert David Kay, who also appeared before the committee, disagreed with the assessment, contending that any chemical weapon produced by Iraq in the 1980s would not remain a viable weapon of mass destruction today. Kay said the chemical agent, though hazardous, is "less toxic than most things Americans have under their kitchen sink at this point". Speaking on National Public Radio's Talk of the Nation, weapons expert Charles Duelfer agreed with Kay, saying: "We said in the [ISG] report that such chemical munitions would probably still be found. But the ones which have been found are left over from the Iran-Iraq war. They are almost 20 years old, and they are in a decayed fashion. It is very interesting that there are so many that were unaccounted for, but they do not constitute a weapon of mass destruction, although they could be a local hazard.

In September of the same year, the report of the Select Committee on Intelligence on Postwar Findings stated that such discoveries were consistent with the ISG assessment that "Iraq and Coalition Forces will continue to discover small numbers of degraded chemical weapons, which the former Regime mislaid or improperly destroyed prior to 1991. The ISG believes the bulk of these weapons were likely abandoned, forgotten and lost during the Iran-Iraq war because tens of thousands of CW munitions were forward deployed along the frequently and rapidly shifting battle front."

==== WMD looting and The New York Times investigative report ====
In October 2014, The New York Times reported that the total number of munitions discovered since 2003 had climbed to 4,990, and that U.S. servicemen had been exposed and injured during the disposal and destruction process. US soldiers reporting exposure to mustard gas and sarin allege they were required to keep their exposure secret, sometimes declined admission to hospital and evacuation home despite the request of their commanders. "We were absolutely told not to talk about it" by a colonel, a former sergeant said. "All [munitions] had been manufactured before 1991, participants said. Filthy, rusty or corroded, a large fraction of them could not be readily identified as chemical weapons at all. Some were empty, though many of them still contained potent mustard agent or residual sarin. Most could not have been used as designed, and when they ruptured dispersed the chemical agents over a limited area."

According to the investigative report, "many chemical weapons incidents clustered around the ruins of the Muthanna State Establishment, the center of Iraqi chemical agent production in the 1980s." The facility had fallen under the supervision of United Nations weapons inspectors after the first Gulf War and was known to house approximately 2,500 corroded chemical munitions, but the vast building complex was left unmanned once hostilities commenced in 2003 and was subject to looting. Participants in the discoveries postulated another reason to conceal their exposure, as some of the chemical shells "appeared to have been designed in the United States, manufactured in Europe and filled in chemical agent production lines built in Iraq by Western companies."

UN inspectors had to evacuate Iraq when hostilities began, and continued to monitor the 411 examined sites remotely to the degree possible. In 2005, they returned to find 90 of 353 sites had been either looted or razed.

=== 2009 Declaration ===
Iraq became a member state of the Chemical Weapons Convention in 2009, declaring "two bunkers with filled and unfilled chemical weapons munitions, some precursors, as well as five former chemical weapons production facilities" according to OPCW Director General Rogelio Pfirter. No plans were announced at that time for the destruction of the material, although it was noted that the bunkers were damaged in the 2003 war and even inspection of the site must be carefully planned.

The declaration contained no surprises, OPCW spokesman Michael Luhan indicated. The production facilities were "put out of commission" by airstrikes during the 1991 conflict, while United Nations personnel afterward secured the chemical munitions in the bunkers. Luhan stated at the time: "These are legacy weapons, remnants." He declined to discuss how many weapons were stored in the bunkers or what materials they contained. The weapons were not believed to be in a usable state.

The destruction of these remnants was completed in 2018.

== Public perception ==
In a study published in 2005, a group of researchers assessed the effects reports and retractions in the media had on American society's memory regarding the search for WMD in Iraq since the War in 2003. The study focused on populations in two coalition countries (Australia and USA) and one opposed to the war (Germany). This led to three conclusions:

1. The repetition of tentative news stories, even if they are subsequently disconfirmed, can assist in the creation of false memories in a substantial proportion of people.
2. Once information is published, its subsequent correction does not alter people's beliefs unless they are suspicious about the motives underlying the events the news stories are about.
3. When people ignore corrections, they do so irrespective of how certain they are that the corrections occurred.

A poll conducted between June and September 2003 asked people whether they thought evidence of WMD had been discovered in Iraq. They were also asked which media sources they relied upon. Those who obtained their news primarily from Fox News were three times as likely to believe that evidence of WMD had been discovered in Iraq than those who relied on PBS and NPR for their news, and one-third more likely than those who primarily watched CBS.

Media source	Respondents believing evidence of WMD had been found in Iraq
Fox	33%
CBS	23%
NBC	20%
CNN	20%
ABC	19%
Print media	17%
PBS–NPR	11%

Based on a series of polls taken from June–September 2003.

== See also ==
- At the Center of the Storm: My Years at the CIA
- Alexander Coker
- Curveball (informant)
- David Kelly
- Dodgy Dossier
- Corinne Heraud
- Iraqi aluminum tubes
- Office of Special Plans
- Operation Rockingham
- Demetrius Perricos
- Project Babylon, a project with unknown objectives commissioned by Iraqi president Saddam Hussein to build a series of "superguns"
- Samson Option
- Syria and weapons of mass destruction
- WMD conjecture after the 2003 invasion of Iraq
- Yellowcake forgery
- The Dark Pictures Anthology: House of Ashes
- 2026 Iran war
