= Amir Muhammad =

Amir Muhammad may refer to:

- Amir Muhammad (director) (born 1972), Malaysian film director and producer
- Amir Muhammad, individual suspected of involvement in the murder of the Notorious B.I.G. (1997)
- Amer Mohammad Rashid (born 1939), former Iraqi politician
- Amir Mokhammad (born 1996), Russian footballer
- Amir Muhammed (1931–2026), Founding Rector and Chairman Board of Governors of the National University of Computer and Emerging Sciences
