= Operation Rockingham =

British government codename

Operation Rockingham was the codeword for UK involvement in inspections in Iraq following the war over Kuwait in 1990–91. Early in 1991 the United Nations Special Commission (UNSCOM) on Iraq was established to oversee the destruction of Iraq's weapons of mass destruction. Use of the codeword was referred to in the annual British defence policy white paper "Statement on the Defence Estimates 1991" (published in July that year as Command Paper 1559-I) where at page 28 it states "The United Kingdom is playing a full part in the work of the Special Commission; our involvement is known as Operation ROCKINGHAM." The activities carried out by the UK as part of Rockingham were detailed in the following white paper (published in July 1992 as Command Paper 1981).

The codename languished in obscurity for a decade or so, used only by those in support of inspections in Iraq. Each department of the UK government directly involved in these support activities would have its staff allocated to "Rockingham" duties. In the Defence Intelligence Staff, the team involved with Iraq activities was known as the "Rockingham Cell". The codename hit the headlines after the invasion of Iraq in 2003, over allegations that Operation Rockingham was a propaganda effort within the British intelligence world.

== The Rockingham Allegations ==
In an interview with the Scottish Sunday Herald in June 2003, former US military intelligence officer and UN weapons inspector Scott Ritter claimed that Operation Rockingham was a secret UK intelligence unit. Journalist Neil Mackay described the function of Operation Rockingham, in Ritter's words, as "producing misleading intelligence on Iraq's weapons of mass destruction, which could be used as justification for action against Iraq". The article claimed, based on Ritter's allegations, that the Rockingham cell was at the center of various British and US intelligence organisations collecting information on Iraq's WMD, and that the unit dealt with intelligence obtained from a variety of sources, including Iraqi defectors and the UN arms inspections organisation in Iraq UNSCOM, which Rockingham had penetrated. According to Scott Ritter the unit amassed evidence selectively, with government backing, for political goals:

"Operation Rockingham cherry-picked intelligence. It received hard data, but had a preordained outcome in mind. It only put forward a small percentage of the facts when most were ambiguous or noted no WMD... It became part of an effort to maintain a public mindset that Iraq was not in compliance with the inspections. They had to sustain the allegation that Iraq had WMD [when] Unscom was showing the opposite."

For example, Ritter claimed, Rockingham would leak false information to weapons inspectors but then use the inspections as evidence for WMD: "Rockingham was the source of some very controversial information which led to inspections of a suspected ballistic missile site. We ... found nothing. However, our act of searching allowed the US and UK to say that the missiles existed."

Ritter alleged that "Operation Rockingham" assumed a central role within the UK intelligence system in building the case that Iraq's weapons of mass destruction capabilities constituted a threat to the UK and the US.

Ritter said that the Rockingham cell included military officers, intelligence services representatives as well as civilian Ministry of Defence personnel. According to Ritter, the British weapons expert David Kelly, played an important role in Operation Rockingham. Ritter describes him as "Rockingham's go-to person for translating the data that came out of Unscom into concise reporting".

The day before he died, Kelly had told the parliamentary Intelligence and Security Committee (ISC) : "Within the defence intelligence services I liaise with the Rockingham cell." Although this evidence was given in secret, a transcript was released to the Hutton Inquiry.

The press jumped on a suggestion that the only other public mention of "Operation Rockingham" prior to David Kelly's ISC evidence was by Brigadier Richard Holmes while giving evidence to the defence select committee in June 1998. This clearly overlooked the public references to Rockingham that had been made in 1991 and 1992.

== The Counter Claims ==
John Morrison, the founder and manager of the DIS Rockingham cell, comprehensively denied Ritter's allegations as wholly unfounded. In a letter to the "Guardian" newspaper he stated:

"Rockingham was a tiny cell which drew on and coordinated all the resources of the DIS; its only aim was to provide leads for Unscom teams, which it did very successfully despite the problems of sanitising sensitive intelligence. Inevitably it was most effective in its earliest years, when Iraq's main WMD facilities, nuclear programme and stocks of chemical and biological weapons were destroyed."

After the evidence to the Hutton Inquiry had been published it became clear that senior experts in the DIS assessment staff, including Dr Brian Jones, were unhappy about the wording in the dossier concerning the threat to the UK posed by Iraq's Weapons of Mass Destruction.

Jones and others had complained in writing to the then Deputy Chief of Defence Intelligence (Tony Cragg) that the wording of the dossier was too strong. For instance, they felt claims that Iraq "could" launch Chemical or Biological Weapons within 45 minutes of an order to do so should have had caveats attached. Their complaints were overruled by the then Chief of Defence Intelligence Air Marshal Sir Joe French.

It was claimed at the Hutton Inquiry that the 45 minutes claim was based on "compartmentalized" intelligence from MI6 which the Joint Intelligence Committee had seen but that the weapons experts in DIS had not. Writing in the Independent on 4 February 2004, Dr Jones said that it was unlikely that anyone with WMD expertise had seen the "compartmentalized" report prior to its inclusion in the dossier, and if they had, they would have been sceptical.

Contrary to the Ritter allegations that the Rockingham cell DIS "cherry-picked intelligence", the DIS staff had been some of the most sceptical voices with regard to intelligence on Iraq's weapons of mass destruction capabilities. After his time in the DIS, John Morrison worked for the ISC as its investigator until he was sacked for saying in a BBC interview that when the Prime Minister asserted that the threat from Iraq's WMD "is current and serious" that he "could almost hear the collective raspberry going up around Whitehall".

The report published by the Butler Review in July 2004 dedicated a page to Operation Rockingham (p. 104). It countered Ritter's claims by stating authoritatively that after its creation in 1991 within the DIS, "Rockingham was responsible for briefing some of the personnel who formed part of UNSCOM and International Atomic Energy Agency inspection teams. It processed information received as a result of the inspections, and acted as a central source of advice on continuing inspection activity. Rockingham also advised FCO and MOD policy branches on the provision of UK experts from government and industry to work with UNSCOM and the IAEA as members of inspection teams. Rockingham included an officer detached to Bahrain to staff an organisation known as GATEWAY to co-ordinate briefings to, and debriefings of, inspection team members as they deployed to, and returned from, Iraq." After being reduced to one member of staff in 1998, it was again expanded to "provide UK support to UNMOVIC".

"No official feedback from UNMOVIC was offered, nor expected. Rockingham did not brief or debrief individual inspectors. It did, however, continue to provide UNMOVIC and the IAEA with all-source UK intelligence assessments of the extent of Iraq's nuclear, biological, chemical and ballistic missile programmes, and information about sites of potential significance. It acted as the focus for the work tasked by the JIC on the analysis of the Iraqi declaration of 7 December 2002" (that is, the 12,000-page weapons declaration handed over by Iraq as required by UN resolution).

== See also ==
- Downing Street Memo
- Operation Mass Appeal
- September Dossier
