= In Shifting Sands: The Truth About Unscom and the Disarming of Iraq =

2001 film by Scott Ritter

- Directed by: Scott Ritter
- Written by: Alex Cohn; Scott Ritter; Scott Rosann
- Produced by: Alex Cohn
- Starring: Tariq Aziz; Rolf Ekeus; Scott Ritter
- Cinematography: Dan Lehrecke; John Millieghta; Mark Niuewenhof
- Edited by: Jed Factor
- Music by: Eben Levy
- Distributed by: Five Rivers; M&L Banks
- Release date: 2001
- Running time: 92 minutes
- Country: United States
- Language: English

In Shifting Sands: The Truth About Unscom and the Disarming of Iraq is a 2001 documentary by Scott Ritter that discusses the UNSCOM inspections in Iraq. Ritter was a chief United Nations weapons inspector in Iraq from 1991 to 1998. These inspections were in search of "weapons of mass destruction" during the later years of the regime of Saddam Hussein.

The film was completed and distributed for theatrical release prior to the 2003 invasion of Iraq.

== Background ==
When Ritter resigned from UNSCOM in 1998, he claimed that the United Nations Security Council was caving to Iraq's demands that certain sensitive sites not be inspected and contended that Iraq remained a danger. In In Shifting Sands, Ritter reserves his position. The film is a follow-up to Ritter's 1999 book Endgame, which supported Hussein's claims that the United States used UNSCOM as a cover to spy on Iraq for the United States and Israel almost from the time weapons inspections began in 1991.

== Plot ==
The film traces the history of UNSCOM, created by the United Nations Security Council in 1991 after the Gulf War to oversee the destruction of Iraq's biological and chemical weapons. Ritter repeats the charge that the U.S. used UNSCOM to spy on Iraq and alleged that weapons inspectors had been given a deadline to give the United States a pretext to conduct a weeks-long bombing campaign in March 1998.

The film also provides a detailed look into the inner workings of weapons inspectors. In one part of the film, the archive of Iraq's nuclear and biological weapons program is found stashed at a pig farm, which Ritter contends prove his contention that UNSCOM found everything worth finding.

== Financing ==
The film cost $530,000 to make, $400,000 of which provided by Iraqi American businessman Shakir al Khafaji. Ritter stated that he had checked out al-Khafaji via a reporter with sources in the CIA and was confident that he was not getting any quid pro quo from the Iraqi government.

== Reception ==
Chief UN inspector Richard Butler, Ritter's boss, called Ritter's allegations "completely false" and described the movie as a "propaganda film." Dave Kehr in The New York Times called In Shifting Sands a "surprisingly dry and dispassionate account of UNSCOM." Kehr writes that Ritter's trustfulness that the film's financing was not in return for a quid pro quo was "out of place" for a UN weapons inspector. The U.S. Mission to the United Nations refused to comment on the film.

The film argued that Iraq did not possess weapons of mass destruction because of the UN weapons inspection programme. Ritter's documentary was partially financed by Iraqi American businessman Shakir al Khafaji. Ritter denied any quid pro quo with Al-Khafaji, according to Laurie Mylroie, writing for the Financial Times. When Ritter was asked "how he would characterize anyone suggesting that Mr. Khafaji was offering allocations in [his] name", Mr. Ritter replied: "I'd say that person's a fucking liar ... and tell him to come over here so I can kick his ass." Al-Khafaji pled guilty to multiple felony charges in 2004 for his involvement with the U.N. Oil-for-Food scandal.

== See also ==
- Iraq and weapons of mass destruction
- United Nations Special Commission
