= WMD conjecture after the 2003 invasion of Iraq =

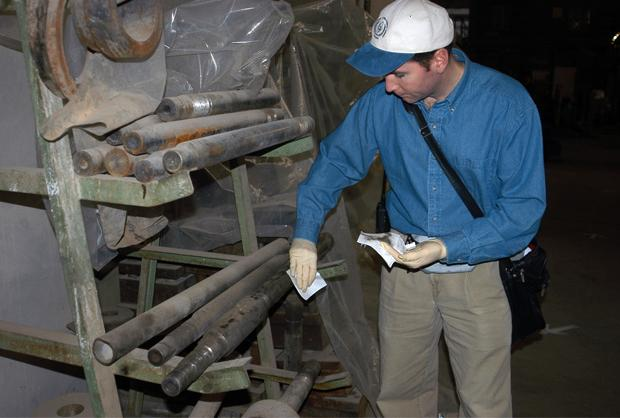
A UN weapons inspector takes samples at an Iraqi machine tool factory in December 2002, several months before the invasion.

The United Nations Monitoring, Verification and Inspection Commission (UNMOVIC) and the United States-led Iraq Survey Group (ISG) failed to find any of the alleged stockpiles of weapons of mass destruction in Iraq that were used as a rationale for the 2003 U.S.-led invasion. The United States effectively ended the search effort for unconventional weaponry in 2005, and the Iraq Intelligence Commission concluded that the judgements of the U.S. intelligence community regarding the continued existence of weapons of mass destruction and an associated military program were mistaken. The official findings of the CIA in 2004 were that Iraqi President Saddam Hussein "did not possess stockpiles of illicit weapons at the time of the U.S. invasion in March 2003 and had not begun any program to produce them."

During and immediately following these searches, many theories were proposed to explain the sudden disappearance of Iraqi WMD—assuming that any had, in fact, existed. These theories included conspiracy theories, accusations against other governments and claims of successful deception efforts by Saddam Hussein. In various theories, Russia, Syria, Lebanon, Iran, and Pakistan were all alleged to be involved with moving or concealing Iraq's supposed WMD arsenal. In 2004, a theory was advanced that WMD might still remain hidden somewhere within Iraq. While some remnant chemical warheads were discovered, dating to the Iran–Iraq War era, none were newer than 1991. Some of these chemical weapons were found near the Muthanna State Establishment facility northwest of Baghdad.

After much criticism of the war during the years that followed, every figure who had previously supported the claims of WMD in Iraq, with the exception of U.S. Vice President Dick Cheney, acknowledged that they had been wrong. A related debate also emerged over whether the figures who had pushed for war were inadvertently misled by intelligence or had, in fact, intentionally deceived the public. The failure to find WMD "would leave deep and lasting consequences for both spies and politicians," and did "lasting damage to the credibility of U.S. intelligence." It also spurred the U.S. intelligence community to develop "new standards for analysis and oversight." Avril Haines, U.S. Director of National Intelligence from 2021 to 2025, was quoted in a 2023 article as saying: “We learned critical lessons in the wake of our flawed assessment of an active WMD program in Iraq in 2002," having "expanded the use of structured analytic techniques, established community-wide analytic standards, and enhanced tradecraft oversight" in the time since.

== No such stockpiles ==
=== Saddam knew there were no stockpiles ===
On 13 December 2003, Saddam Hussein was captured by U.S. forces during Operation Red Dawn. Time Online Edition reports that in his first interrogation he was asked whether Iraq had any WMD. According to an official, his reply was:

"No, of course not, the U.S. dreamed them up itself to have a reason to go to war with us." The interrogator continued along this line, said the official, asking: "if you had no weapons of mass destruction then why not let the U.N. inspectors into your facilities?" Saddam’s reply: "We didn’t want them to go into the presidential areas and intrude on our privacy."

Later, through interrogations in US custody, Saddam revealed that, immediately prior to the start of the 2003 US invasion, he had announced to his generals that there were no WMD. One theory given currency by Charles Duelfer is that Saddam sent out different signals to different people in order to keep them confused and help stay in power. Documents since captured inside Iraq by coalition forces are reported to reveal Saddam's frustration with weapon inspections. Meeting transcripts record him saying to senior aides: "We don't have anything hidden!" In another, he remarks: "When is this going to end?" And another: "Don't think for a minute that we still have WMD. We have nothing."

Hans Blix from the Weapons of Mass Destruction Commission said in his early 2004 book, Disarming Iraq, that Saddam had successfully been deterred from keeping WMD stockpiles by outside pressure. In regards to why he appeared so unsuccessful in convincing others that Iraq had no stockpiles (allowing for sanctions that crippled Iraq's economy), Blix pointed out several reasons:

- The United States had repeatedly made it clear to Saddam that only him disappearing from the stage would solve the issue. He did not expect the inspectors to go away.
- Saddam was often noted as being very proud of his country, and may have been against allowing other countries' observers to just enter several of Iraq's most important facilities.
- Iraq did repeatedly tell the UN that it had followed their obligations and that they had eliminated all prohibited weapons, but they might have considered deliberate ambiguity to be advantageous.
- Iraq may have wanted to keep their conventional weaponry secret. Some inspectors had close connections with the military and intelligence of countries that were bombing Iraq.

=== Saddam did not know there were no stockpiles ===
According to The Guardian in late 2003, British officials in Whitehall began circulating a theory that Saddam Hussein and his senior advisers "may have been hoodwinked" by lower-ranking officers "into believing that Iraq really did possess weapons of mass destruction." And as most of the informers for British intelligence were the same high-level advisers close to Saddam, the British were also fooled. The paper adds that this hypothesis "is open to the interpretation that the government is searching for an excuse, however implausible, for failure to discover any WMD in Iraq." Commenting on the findings of the Butler intelligence review six months later, USA Today reported that Britain's Secret Intelligence Service had "shockingly few reliable human sources inside Saddam's regime."

== Stockpiles transported to another country ==
Rumors abounded of possible transportation of Iraqi weapons of mass destruction to foreign countries, namely Syria, Lebanon and Iran. This was particularly prevalent in the weeks before Operation Iraqi Freedom began.

=== Possibility of Russian involvement ===
Romanian intelligence defector Ion Mihai Pacepa alleged that an operation for the removal of chemical weapons was prepared by the Soviet Union for Libya, and that he was told over thirty years ago by Romanian President Nicolae Ceaușescu, KGB chairman Yury Andropov, and later, Yevgeny Primakov, about the existence of a similar plan for Iraq. It is "perfectly obvious", wrote Pacepa, that the Russian GRU agency helped Saddam Hussein to destroy, hide, or transfer his chemical weapons prior to the American invasion of Iraq in 2003. "After all, Russia helped Saddam get his hands on them in the first place."

=== Syria ===
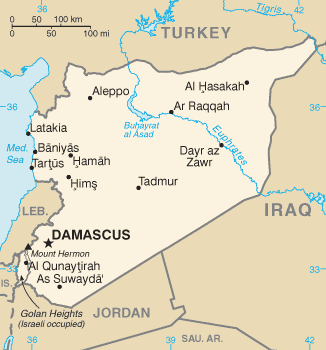
Map of Syria, showing its location west of Iraq

Former Iraqi general Georges Sada claimed that in late 2002, Saddam had ordered all of his stockpiles to be moved to Syria. He appeared on Fox News' Hannity & Colmes in January 2006 to discuss his book, Saddam's Secrets: How an Iraqi General Defied and Survived Saddam Hussein. Anticipating the arrival of weapon inspectors on November 1, Sada said Saddam took advantage of the June 4 Zeyzoun Dam disaster in Syria by forming an "air bridge", loading them onto cargo aircraft and flying them out of the country.

They were moved by air and by ground, 56 sorties by jumbo, 747, and 27 were moved, after they were converted to cargo aircraft, they were moved to Syria.

In January 2004, Nizar Nayuf, a Syrian journalist who moved to Western Europe, said in a letter to the Dutch newspaper De Telegraaf that he knows the three sites where Iraq's weapons of mass destruction are kept inside Syria. According to Nayuf's witness, described as a senior source inside Syrian military intelligence he had known for two years, Iraq's WMD are in tunnels dug under the town of al-Baida near the city of Hama in northern Syria, in the village of Tal Snan, north of the town of Salamija, where there is a big Syrian air force camp, and in the city of Sjinsjar on the Syrian border with the Lebanon, south of Homs city. Nayouf also wrote that the transfer of Iraqi WMD to Syria was organized by the commanders of Saddam Hussein's Iraqi Republican Guard, including General Shalish, with the help of Assef Shawkat, Bashar al-Assad's cousin. Shoakat is the CEO of Bhaha, an import/export company owned by the Assad family. U.S. Secretary of State Condoleezza Rice responded to this accusation by saying "I don't think we are at the point that we can make a judgment on this issue. There hasn't been any hard evidence that such a thing happened. But obviously we're going to follow up every lead, and it would be a serious problem if that, in fact, did happen."

A similar claim was made by Lieutenant General Moshe Ya'alon, a former Israeli officer who served as chief of staff of the Israel Defense Forces from July 2002 to June 2005. In April 2004, he was quoted as saying that "perhaps they transferred them to another country, such as Syria." General Ya'alon told the New York Sun more firmly in December 2005 that "He [Saddam] transferred the chemical agents from Iraq to Syria." The Fall 2005 Middle East Quarterly also reported Israeli Prime Minister Ariel Sharon as having said in a December, 2002 appearance on Israel's Channel 2, "... chemical and biological weapons which Saddam is endeavoring to conceal have been moved from Iraq to Syria."

In February 2006, Ali Ibrahim al-Tikriti, a former Iraqi general who defected shortly before the Gulf War in 1991, gave an interview to Ryan Mauro, in which he stated:

I know Saddam's weapons are in Syria due to certain military deals that were made going as far back as the late 1980s that dealt with the event that either capitals were threatened with being overrun by an enemy nation. Not to mention I have discussed this in-depth with various contacts of mine who have confirmed what I already knew. At this point Saddam knew that the United States were eventually going to come for his weapons and the United States wasn't going to just let this go like they did in the original Gulf War. He knew that he had lied for this many years and wanted to maintain legitimacy with the pan Arab nationalists. He also has wanted since he took power to embarrass the West and this was the perfect opportunity to do so. After Saddam denied he had such weapons why would he use them or leave them readily available to be found? That would only legitimize President Bush, whom he has a personal grudge against. What we are witnessing now is many who opposed the war to begin with are rallying around Saddam saying we overthrew a sovereign leader based on a lie about WMD. This is exactly what Saddam wanted and predicted.

Al-Tikriti's interview was featured prominently on conservative web sites such as FrontPageMag and WorldNetDaily, but did not receive mainstream press attention. Salon magazine editor Alex Koppelman doubts both Sada's and al-Tikriti's story, arguing that Syria's decision to side with the coalition against Iraq in 1990 would have nullified any previous military deals.

The Iraq Survey Group was told that Saddam Hussein periodically removed guards from the Syrian border and replaced them with his intelligence agents who then supervised the movement of banned materials between Syria and Iraq, according to two unnamed defense sources that spoke with The Washington Times. They reported heavy traffic in large trucks on the border before the United States invasion. Earlier, in a telephone interview with The Daily Telegraph, the former head of the Iraqi Survey Group, David Kay, said: "[W]e know from some of the interrogations of former Iraqi officials that a lot of material went to Syria before the war, including some components of Saddam's WMD program. Precisely what went to Syria, and what has happened to it, is a major issue that needs to be resolved." Satellite imagery also picked up activity on the Iraq-Syria border before and during the invasion. James R. Clapper, who headed the National Imagery and Mapping Agency in 2003, has said U.S. intelligence tracked a large number of vehicles, mostly civilian trucks, moving from Iraq into Syria. Clapper suggested the trucks may have contained materiel related to Iraq's WMD programs.

ISG formed a special working group to investigate and consider these claims. Charles Duelfer, head of inspectorate at time of publication, summarized the group's conclusion: "Based on the evidence available at present, ISG judged that it was unlikely that an official transfer of WMD material from Iraq to Syria took place. However, ISG was unable to rule out unofficial movement of limited WMD-related materials."

=== Jordan ===
In April 2004, Jordanian officials announced that they had thwarted a planned chemical attack on Jordan's intelligence headquarters by Al-Qaeda-linked terrorists that could have killed 20,000 people. Acting under the orders of Abu-Musab al-Zarqawi, self-professed leader of Al Qaeda in Iraq, officials said the plotters entered Jordan from Syria with trucks filled with 20 tons of explosives. Syrian officials denied the claims. U.S. officials stated there was debate within the CIA and other U.S. agencies about whether the intent was to create a chemical weapon or conventional explosive bomb: a large quantity of sulfuric acid was seized, which can be used as a blister agent, but is more commonly used to increase the size of conventional explosions.

In February 2006, a Jordanian military court sentenced nine men, including Iraq's al-Qaeda leader Abu Musab al-Zarqawi, to death for plotting the attack. Lawyers for the men had argued that confessions had been obtained during two weeks of torture. Zarqawi admitted his group was behind the plot, but denied that chemical weapons were to be used. Two men were jailed for up to 3 years, and two men were acquitted.

=== Lebanon ===
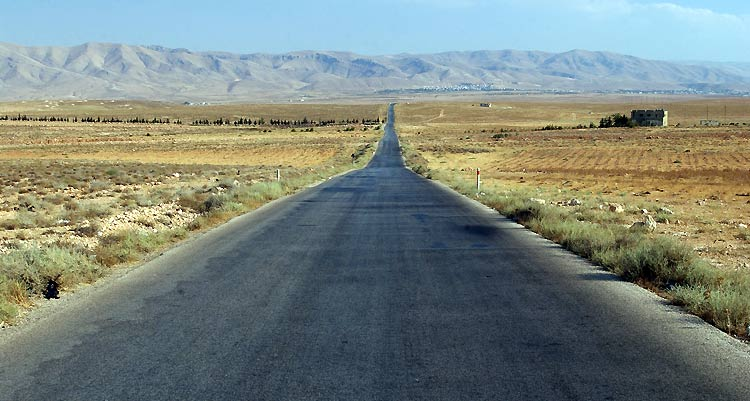
A road through the Bekaa Valley

American Internet newspaper World Tribune reported in August 2003 that Iraq's WMD may have been moved to Lebanon's heavily fortified Bekaa Valley. According to the story, United States intelligence identified "a stream of tractor-trailer trucks" moving from Iraq through Syria to Lebanon in the weeks before invasion.

Former United States Deputy Undersecretary of Defense John A. Shaw also alleged that the Russians played an extensive role in transporting materials into both Syria and Lebanon, "to prevent the United States from discovering them." Shaw claimed trucks were transporting materials to Syria and returning empty. In addition, containers with warnings painted on them were moved to a Beirut hospital basement. "They were moved by Russian Spetsnaz (special forces) units out of uniform, that were specifically sent to Iraq to move the weaponry and eradicate any evidence of its existence". The People's Republic of China is also alleged to have helped remove WMD equipment. Principal Deputy Assistant Secretary of Defense for Public Affairs Lawrence Di Rita called Shaw's charges "absurd and without any foundation." DiRita noted that Shaw "has been directed on several occasions to produce evidence of his wide-ranging and fantastic charges and provide it to the DoD inspector general. To my knowledge, he has not done so." Former Russian Foreign Intelligence director Evgeny Primakov rejected the story, telling Kommersant that "all of Shaw's sensational revelations are complete nonsense."

=== Iran ===
John Loftus saw information that led him to believe Iran had acquired illicit material. In a story on Dave Gaubatz, Melanie Phillips quoted Loftus as saying "Saddam had the last laugh and donated his secret stockpile to benefit Iran's nuclear weapons programme." Phillips followed up her report by reproducing a letter from John Loftus calling for a congressional investigation of John Negroponte, whom he accused of concealing the information. Salon magazine columnist Glenn Greenwald accused Philips of promoting a moronic and deranged conspiracy theory.

=== Pakistan ===
Former head of the Indian counter-terrorism division and member of the National Security Advisory Board, B Raman, suggests A.Q. Khan may have assisted in shifting Iraq's WMD to Pakistan. Writing for the South Asia Analysis Group, he cites unnamed Pakistani sources claiming Khan agreed to aid Iraqi intelligence officials "who sought his help" in having some prohibited material airlifted from Syria to Pakistan to prevent it "falling into the hands of the UN inspectors." According to Raman, Pervez Musharraf has been working hard "to see that this is not played up in the Pakistani media."

== Stockpiles still hidden in Iraq ==
The US had had positive intelligence of Iraqi chemical weapons during the Iran-Iraq war starting in July 1982 and continuing at least through 1988. There were confirmed uses of Sarin, mustard gas and Tabun nerve agent (also known as “GA”). The intelligence agencies relied on that data when they assumed Iraq still had the WMD in 2002, although they could not confirm the information.

Appearing on MSNBC's Hardball in June 2004, Paul Wolfowitz insisted the weapons picture was without change, since Iraq "had a lot of time to move stuff, a lot of time to hide stuff." Three weeks later, Lord Butler of Brockwell said upon conclusion of the Butler Review, "Iraq is a very big place, there is a lot of sand. ... It is impractical to dig up the whole of Iraq, but for somebody to say 'we are absolutely certain that there is nothing there' would be a very rash and unfounded thing to say, in our judgment."

Former Pentagon investigator Dave Gaubatz alleges he found hidden WMD sites in 2003, but that his reports were ignored and then destroyed as part of a cover-up by the CIA, Department of Defense, and Bush administration. This allowed a group of Russians, Iraqis and Syrians to dig up the WMD and move them to Syria. This idea was dismissed by Wired, and Salon, who pointed out that it required President Bush, military leaders, and Senate Democrats to have all colluded in a massive conspiracy theory. The final report of the Iraq Survey Group, by Charles A. Duelfer, special adviser on Iraqi weapons to the C.I.A., concluded that any stockpiles had been destroyed long before the war and that transfers to Syria were "unlikely."

=== Remnant chemical weapons ===
Some remnant WMD were scattered at various locations throughout Iraq, but most were old and unusable. During the U.S. occupation of Iraq, chemical weapons were occasionally identified and destroyed. However, most of the chemical warheads dated to the Iran–Iraq War era, with none newer than 1991. The majority of Iraqi chemical weapons were found near the Muthanna State Establishment, northwest of Baghdad. U.S. and Iraqi personnel sustained weapons-related injuries in six documented cases from 2004 to 2011, including an incident in April 2010 when "an Iraqi police patrol found about a dozen M110 mustard shells near the Tigris River", suffering burns from the "leaking chemical shells." However, many of the details remain classified.
