= Rihab Taha =

Iraqi microbiologist (born 1957)

Rihab Rashid Taha al-Azawi (/riːhɑːb tɑːhɑː/; Arabic: رحاب رشيد طه; born 12 November 1957) is an Iraqi microbiologist, dubbed Dr Germ by United Nations weapons inspectors, who worked in Saddam Hussein's biological weapons program. A 1999 report commissioned by the United States Joint Chiefs of Staff and the Defense Intelligence Agency (DIA) named her as one of the world's most dangerous women. Dr Taha admitted producing germ warfare agents but said they had been destroyed.

Rihab Rashida Taha ranks among the most important of a new breed of Third World weapons designers who were highly nationalistic, western-educated and willing to violate any international norms or scientific ethics. She worked to contribute to Iraqi weapons program. As a result, she became known as the mother of all Third World biological weapons programs. It was Taha who sold the idea of an Iraqi biological weapons program to Saddam Hussein and was given an award for her work in biological weapons, specifically the development of anthrax and botulinum weapons by Saddam Hussein. Moreover, she has been held up as an example to Iraqi women interested in science.

Taha first rose to prominence in the Western media after being named in a 2003 British intelligence dossier, released to the public by the Prime Minister Tony Blair, on Iraq's biological, chemical and nuclear capability. The dossier alleged that Taha had played a leading role in the manufacture of anthrax and other biological agents. It was this dossier that triggered the chain of events that led to the suicide of British UN weapons inspector David Kelly, who was accused of telling a BBC reporter that some of the intelligence had been manipulated. Kelly, as an UNSCOM weapons inspector visiting Iraq on the occasions described below, had interrogated Taha so pitilessly that she was "reduced to tears".

== Background ==
Born in 1957, and a graduate of the University of Baghdad, Taha received her Ph.D. in plant toxins from the University of East Anglia's School of Biological Sciences in Norwich, which she attended from 1980 to 1984. She published two articles on her research, co-authored by her supervisor John Turner, once the head of the School of Biological Sciences. In 1984, "Contribution of tabtoxin to the pathogenicity of Pseudomonas syringae pv. tabac" was published in Physiological Plant Pathology (25, 55–69) and "Effect of tabtoxin on nitrogen metabolism" by J.G. Turner, R.R. Taha & J.M. Debbage was published in Physiologia Plantarum in 1986 (67, 649–653).

Taha is married to the British-educated General Amer Mohammad Rashid, the former Iraqi oil minister and director of Iraq's Military Industrial Corporation, which was responsible for Saddam's advanced weapons programs. Taha met General Rashid, who has a Ph.D. in engineering from the University of Birmingham, when they were both invited to New York City for a meeting with the United Nations Special Commission (UNSCOM) in 1993.

In 1997, Saddam Hussein awarded Taha a medal of scientific achievement and, prior to the 2003 war on Iraq, broadcasts were aired showing Taha and Saddam sitting next to each other. On 10 May 2003, the U.S. government announced that Taha had surrendered to coalition forces.

== Work ==
=== Growth of biological agents ===
Although Taha told her fellow students at Norwich that she wanted to return to Iraq to teach biology, she went instead to work for Iraq's germ warfare program. In 1985, she worked in the al-Muthanna chemical plant near Baghdad, and later became chief production officer in al-Hakam (also spelled al-Hakum), Iraq's top-secret biological-warfare facility at the time.

During several visits to Iraq by United Nations Special Commission (UNSCOM), set up after the 1990 invasion of Kuwait to inspect Iraqi weapons facilities, weapons inspectors were told by Taha that al-Hakam was a chicken-feed plant. "There were a few things that were peculiar about this animal-feed production plant," Charles Duelfer, UNSCOM's deputy executive chairman, later told reporters, "beginning with the extensive air defenses surrounding it."

According to the 1999 DIA report, the normally mild-mannered Taha exploded into violent rages when questioned about al-Hakam, shouting, screaming and, storming out of the room, before returning and smashing a chair. However, in 1995, UNSCOM's principal weapons inspector Rod Barton from Australia showed Taha documents obtained by UNSCOM from the Israeli government that showed the Iraqi regime had just purchased 10 tons of growth media from a British company called Oxoid. Growth media is a mixture of sugar, proteins and minerals that allows microscopic life to grow; it is used in hospitals, where swabs from patients are placed in dishes containing growth media for diagnostic purposes. Iraq's hospital consumption of growth media was just 200 kg a year, yet in 1988, Iraq imported 39 tons of it.

Shown this evidence by UNSCOM, Taha admitted to the inspectors that her biological weapons agency had grown 19,000 litres of botulism toxin; 8,000 litres of anthrax; 2,000 litres of aflatoxins, which can cause liver cancer; Clostridium perfringens, a bacterium that can cause gas gangrene; and ricin, a castor bean derivative which can kill by inhibiting protein synthesis. She also admitted conducting research into cholera, salmonella, foot and mouth disease, and camel pox, a disease that uses the same growth techniques as smallpox, but is safer for researchers to work with. It was because of the discovery of Taha's work with camel pox that the U.S. and British intelligence services feared Saddam Hussein may have been planning to weaponize the smallpox virus. Iraq had a smallpox outbreak in the 1970s and UNSCOM scientists believe the government would have retained contaminated material.

=== Weaponisation of biological agents ===
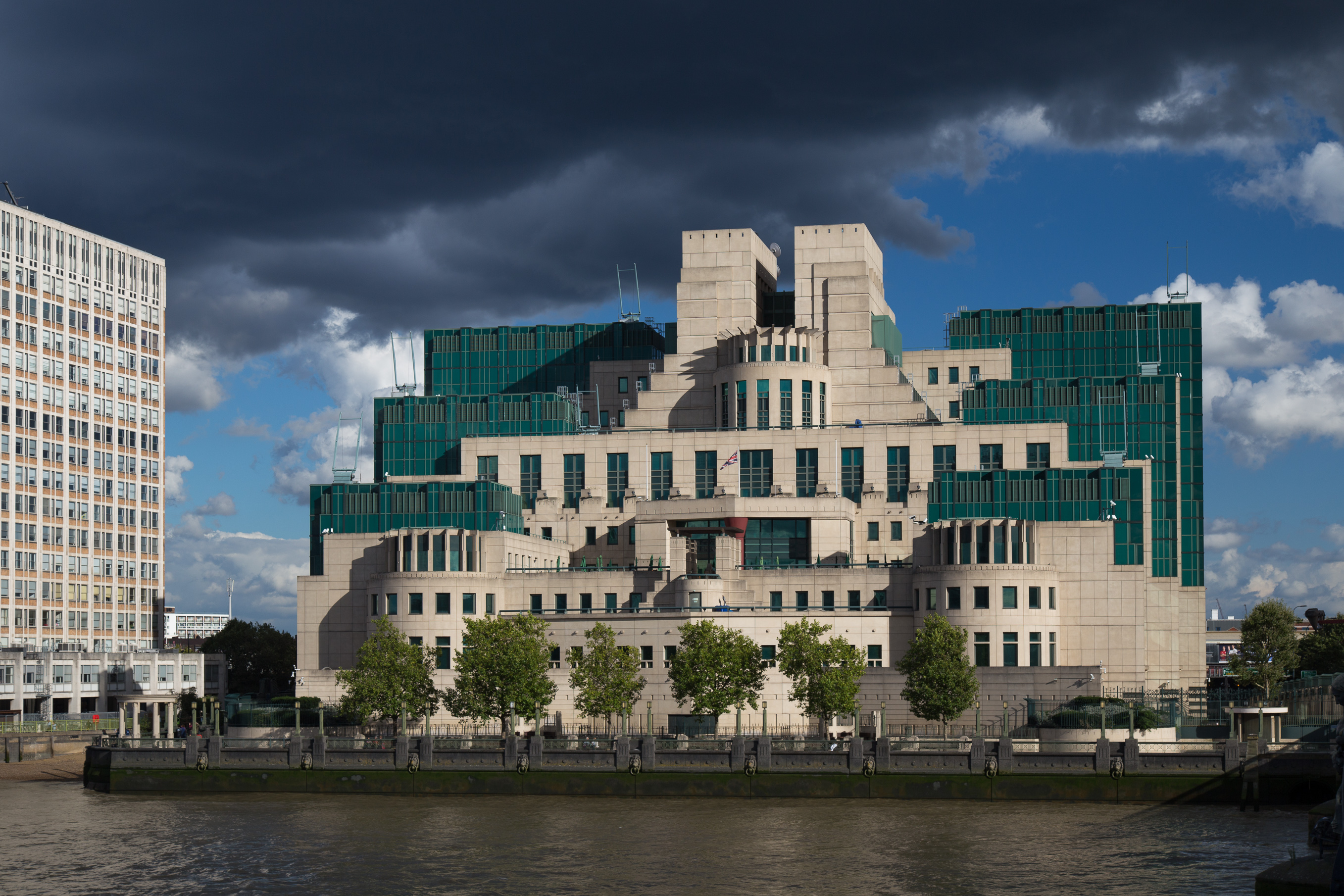
The British Secret Intelligence Service (SIS) and UNSCOM catalogued the weaponization by Taha's team of biological agents. Above, the SIS building photographed from Vauxhall Bridge Road, London.

UNSCOM learned that, In August 1990, after Iraq's invasion of Kuwait, Taha's team was ordered to set up a program to weaponize the biological agents. By January 1991, a team of 100 scientists and support staff had filled 157 bombs and 16 missile warheads with botulin toxin, and 50 bombs and five missile warheads with anthrax. In an interview with the BBC, Taha denied the Iraqi government had weaponized the bacteria. "We never intended to use it," she told journalist Jane Corbin of the BBC's Panorama program. "We never wanted to cause harm or damage to anybody." However, UNSCOM found the munitions dumped in a river near the facility at al-Hakam. UNSCOM also discovered that Taha's team had conducted inhalation experiments on donkeys from England and on beagles from Germany. The inspectors seized photographs showing beagles having convulsions inside sealed containers.

=== Missing anthrax ===
On 18 March 2005, the Associated Press reported that Taha had provided an explanation for the 1,800 gallon discrepancy between the amount of anthrax the UN knew she had manufactured, and the amount she admitted to destroying. The missing anthrax was one of the stated reasons for the Iraq war and was emphasized by then-U.S. Secretary of State Colin Powell during his February 2003 speech to the Security Council. However, according to an Iraq Survey Group report published on 6 October 2004, Taha told American investigators that she and her colleagues dumped the missing anthrax near the gates of one of Saddam's palaces in April 1991, but were afraid to admit to this for fear of incurring Saddam's wrath. The Iraqi biologists therefore told the UN weapons inspectors that the missing anthrax had never existed.

=== Suspected experimentation on human beings ===
The inspectors feared that Taha's team had experimented on human beings. During one inspection, they discovered two primate-sized inhalation chambers, one measuring 5 cubic metres, though there was no evidence the Iraqis had used large primates in their experiments. According to former weapons inspector Scott Ritter in his 1999 book Endgame: Solving the Iraq Crisis, UNSCOM learned that, between 1 July and 15 August 1995, 50 prisoners from the Abu Ghraib prison were transferred to a military post in al-Haditha, in the northwest of Iraq, (Ritter, 1999). Iraqi opposition groups say that scientists sprayed the prisoners with anthrax, though no evidence was produced to support these allegations. During one experiment, the inspectors were told, 12 prisoners were tied to posts while shells loaded with anthrax were blown up nearby. Ritter's team demanded to see documents from Abu Ghraib prison showing a prisoner count. Ritter writes that they discovered the records for July and August 1995 were missing. Asked to explain the missing documents, the Iraqi government charged that Ritter was working for the CIA and refused to co-operate further with UNSCOM.

=== Statements to press ===
In an interview broadcast in February 2003, Taha said Iraq was justified in producing germ weapons in the 1980s and 1990s to defend itself. She told the British Broadcasting Corp. she was involved in producing Iraq's final weapons declaration to the United Nations. She said Saddam's regime was telling the truth when it said it no longer had any chemical or biological weapons.

Taha told the BBC her country never planned to use the biological agents it produced in the 1980s and early 1990s. "We never wanted to cause harm or damage to anybody," she said. "Iraq has been threatened by different enemies and we are in an area that suffers from regional conflict. I think it is our right to have something to defend ourselves and to have something as a deterrent."

== Taha and Kenneth Bigley ==
On 18 September 2004, the Tawhid and Jihad ("Oneness of God and Holy War") Islamist group, led by Jordanian Abu Musab al-Zarqawi, kidnapped Americans Eugene Armstrong and Jack Hensley, and British engineer Kenneth Bigley, threatening to kill them if Iraqi women prisoners were not released. Armstrong and Hensley were killed within the first 72 hours, but Bigley was kept alive for three weeks. The only Iraqi women prisoners being held at that time, according to the British government, were Taha and another woman scientist, Huda Salih Mahdi Ammash, a bio-tech researcher who was on the U.S. list of the 55 most wanted members of Saddam's regime. It was hoped that the release of these women, who had not been charged with any offence, would trigger the release of Bigley.

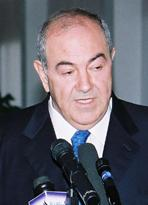
Iyad Allawi, Iraq's prime minister, refused to sanction Taha's release.

On 22 September 2004, Noori Abdul-Rahim Ibrahim, a spokesman for the Iraqi Justice Ministry, said that Taha would be released on bail. He said the decision was not related to Zarqawi's demands, but that the government regularly reviews the cases of prominent detainees, and it was decided to release Taha because she had cooperated with the authorities. However, after a statement from U.S. Secretary of State Colin Powell that there would be no negotiations with terrorists, Iraqi Prime Minister Iyad Allawi announced that neither Taha nor Ammash would be released in the near future. Bigley was beheaded on 7 October 2004.

== Taha's release ==
In December 2005, 22 so-called "high-value" prisoners, including Rihab Taha, were released without charge two days after Iraq's national elections, following over 30 months in confinement. Another female scientist, Huda Salih Mahdi Ammash, nicknamed "Mrs. Anthrax" by the U.S., was also among those released after what the U.S. said was a standardized process of review and an agreement with the interim Iraqi government.

== See also ==
- Aziz al-Abub
- Iraqi biological weapons program
- Timeline of women in science
- UNSCOM
