= Operation Mass Appeal =

MI6 propaganda campaign prior to the invasion of Iraq

Operation Mass Appeal was an operation alleged to have been set up by the British Secret Intelligence Service (SIS, a.k.a. MI6) in the runup to the 2003 invasion of Iraq. In December, 2003, former UN arms inspector Scott Ritter said it was a campaign aimed at planting disinformation in the media about Iraq's alleged weapons of mass destruction.

A "senior British official" admitted to the London Sunday Times in late December, 2003, that the SIS had been at the heart of an unnamed campaign launched in the late 1990s to spread information about Saddam's development of nerve agents and other weapons, but denied that it had planted misinformation. "There were things about Saddam's regime and his weapons that the public needed to know", said the official.

Ritter claimed that the SIS operation secretly incorporated the United Nations Special Commission investigation into Iraq's alleged stockpiles of Weapons of Mass Destruction (WMD) into what he described as its propaganda efforts by recruiting him, a UN weapons inspector and former MI6 collaborator, to provide copies of UN documents and reports on their findings to MI6.

In his book, Iraq Confidential (2005), Ritter described what he said was an MI6-run psychological warfare effort, known as Operation Mass Appeal. According to Ritter: "Mass Appeal served as a focal point for passing MI6 intelligence on Iraq to the media, both in the UK and around the world. The goal was to help shape public opinion about Iraq and the threat posed by WMD." He said MI6 propaganda specialists claimed they could spread the misinformation through "editors and writers who work with us from time to time".

Ritter, in an interview with Amy Goodman of the US news website Democracy Now!, described how he, as an arms inspector for the United Nations Special Commission on Iraq Weapons of Mass Destruction—and UNSCOM itself—became deeply involved in MI6's "Operation Mass Appeal":

I ran intelligence operations for the United Nations in regards to the disarmament of Iraq. That was my job. Part of this job in 1997 and 1998 took on a propaganda aspect, given the fact that we had launched a series of controversial and confrontational inspections in Iraq, which although successful from a disarmament standpoint in exposing aspects of the Iraqi account which were not accurate, were causing problems for the United Nations in the Security Council […] We made a decision. We, being Richard Butler, the Executive Chairman who ran UNSCOM, and his senior staff members, of which I was one, that we needed to clean up our public image, and we did a number of things […] [In December of 1997] I was approached by the British intelligence service, which I had, again, a long relationship with, of an official nature, to see if there was any information in the archives of UNSCOM that could be handed to the British, so that they could in turn work it over, determine its veracity, and then seek to plant it in media outlets around the world, in an effort to try to shape the public opinion of those countries, and then indirectly, through, for instance, a report showing up in the Polish press, shape public opinion in Great Britain and the United States. I went to Richard Butler with the request from the British. He said that he supported this, and we initiated a cooperation that was very short-lived. The first reports were passed to the British sometime in February of 1998. There was a detailed planning meeting in June of 1998, and I resigned in August of 1998. [...] This is an operation – Operation Mass Appeal, that had been going on prior to UNSCOM being asked to be the source of particular data, and it’s an operation that continued after my resignation.
