= Amir Muhammed =

Pakistani political advisor (1931–2026)

- Born: 21 November 1931; Udaypur Village, Una Tehsil, Hoshiarpur district, Punjab, British Indian Empire (present-day Pakistan)
- Died: 23 August 2026 (aged 94); Lahore, Punjab, Pakistan
- Education: University of Punjab; Oxford University
- Organization: National University of Computer and Emerging Sciences
- Spouse: Fazilat Amir (deceased)
- Children: 5

Amir Muhammed (21 November 1931 – 23 August 2026) was a Pakistani political advisor who was the founding rector and chairman of the Board of Governors of the National University of Computer and Emerging Sciences. Previously, he was president of the Pakistan Academy of Sciences. He was appointed vice chancellor of University of Agriculture (Faisalabad) in 1974 in the wake of food crisis in Pakistan. In 1978, he was appointed as founder-chairman of Pakistan Agricultural Research Council where he served until 1990. Muhammed died in August 2026, at the age of 94.

== Positions held ==
- Founder/Chairman, Pakistan Agricultural Research Council (PARC) (1978–1990)
- Federal Secretary, Ministry of Agriculture (Pakistan) (1978–1990)
- Advisor to the President of Pakistan (1977–1978)
- Vice-Chancellor, University of Agriculture, Faisalabad (1974–1978)
- Director, Nuclear Institute for Agriculture and Biology (NIAB), Faisalabad (1969–1974)
- Senior Research Officer, Pakistan Council of Scientific and Industrial Research (PCSIR), Lahore (1959–1961)
