= Corinne Heraud =

UN official (born 1963)

Corinne Heraud was formerly a Chief Inspector of the Missile inspection team in Iraq, while working for the United Nations Monitoring, Verification and Inspection Commission (UNMOVIC). Prior to that she held various other posts at UNMOVIC and had been seconded from the French Government to carry out work for UNMOVIC's predecessor, the United Nations Special Commission (UNSCOM).

It is believed Chief Engineer (Lieutenant Colonel) Heraud was a leading contributor to the missile section of UNMOVIC's working document on Iraq's Unresolved Disarmament Issues. Under Lieutenant Colonel Heraud's leadership, the Al Samoud missile was destroyed.

Lieutenant Colonel Heraud is mentioned in the evidence of the Hutton Inquiry investigation into the circumstances surrounding the death of Dr. David Kelly.
