= Amer Mohammad Rashid =

Iraqi politician (born 1939)

- عامر محمد رشيد
- Born: 1939 (age 86–87); Baghdad, Iraq
- Political party: Ba'ath Party

Amer Mohammad Rashid al-Ubaidi (Arabic: عامر محمد رشيد العبيدي; born 1939) is an Iraqi former politician who served as the Oil Minister under Saddam Hussein.

== Life and career ==
Rashid was born in Baghdad in 1939. A general in Iraq's army, he also advised Hussein on other matters, and was sometimes referred to as "Missile Man" in reference to his expertise with weapons delivery systems. He was the husband of Dr. Rihab Taha (a.k.a. "Dr. Germ"), a microbiologist active in research into the production of bioweapons. Iraqi government news sources indicated that he retired from his positions in 2002, at the age of 65.

Rashid was the six of spades in the most-wanted Iraqi playing cards issued by the United States during the 2003 invasion of Iraq. After the invasion commenced, he issued a public statement calling for other Arab nations to decrease oil production, in order "to make the cost of war high for the Americans." American troops raided his Baghdad home on April 14, 2003, in an effort to take he and his wife into custody, but both evaded capture. He surrendered to coalition forces on April 28, 2003, and his wife surrendered on May 10, 2003.

Rashid was quietly released in April 2012, while his wife had been released in December 2005 without charge two days after Iraq's national elections, following over 30 months in confinement.
