= Scott Ritter =

American weapons inspector and writer (born 1961)

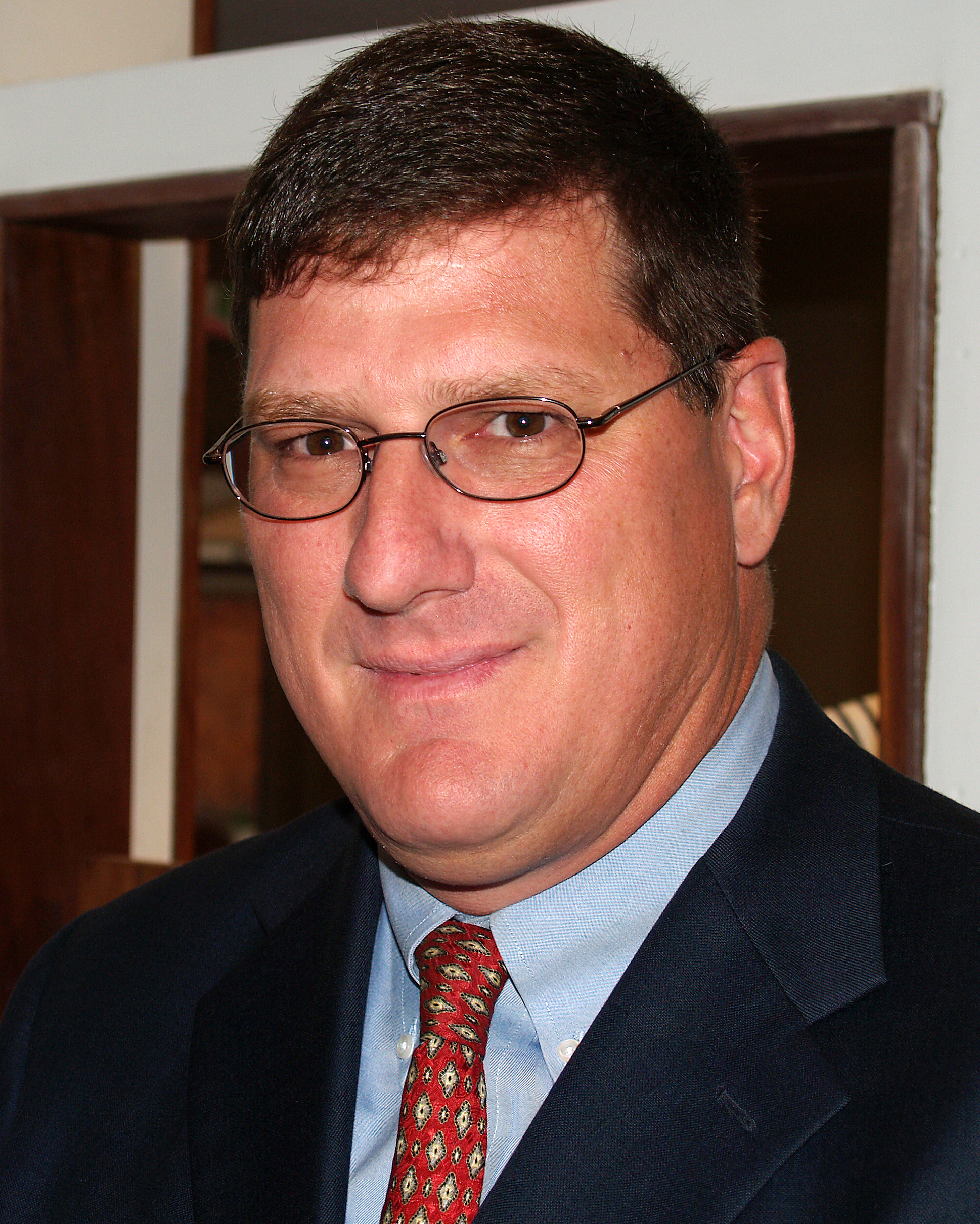
- Ritter in 2007
- Born: William Scott Ritter, Jr. July 15, 1961 (age 65); Gainesville, Florida, U.S.
- Education: Kaiserslautern American High School, Germany
- Alma mater: Franklin and Marshall College
- Occupations: speaker; author; columnist
- Known for: Chief UNSCOM weapons inspector to Iraq, 1991–1998
- Spouse: Marina Khatiashvili (m. 1991)
- Children: 2

William Scott Ritter Jr. (born July 15, 1961) is an American former United States Marine Corps intelligence officer, former United Nations Special Commission (UNSCOM) weapons inspector, author, and commentator.

Ritter was a junior military analyst during Operation Desert Storm. He served as a member of UNSCOM overseeing the disarmament of weapons of mass destruction (WMD) in Iraq from 1991 to 1998, from which he resigned in protest. Later he became a critic of the Iraq War and United States foreign policy in the Middle East. In recent years, he has been a regular contributor to Russian state media outlets RT and Sputnik. He has visited Russia in support of Russia since the start of the Russian invasion of Ukraine. In June 2024, Ritter claimed that US authorities seized his passport and prevented him from visiting Russia.

In 2011, Ritter was convicted of several criminal offenses after engaging in sexually explicit online activity with a police officer who was posing as a 15-year-old girl.

== Early and personal life ==
The son of an Air Force officer and a military nurse, Ritter was born into a military family in 1961 in Gainesville, Florida. He graduated from Kaiserslautern American High School in Kaiserslautern west of Mannheim, Germany in 1979. He earned a Bachelor of Arts degree from Franklin & Marshall College in Lancaster, Pennsylvania. He studied the history of the Soviet Union there and received departmental honors.

While working in Votkinsk as an intelligence officer, Ritter met his second wife Marina Khatiashvili, a Soviet translator from Georgia. The couple married in 1991 and have two children; twin daughters.

=== Arrests and conviction for sex offenses ===
Ritter was the subject of two law enforcement sting operations in 2001. He was charged in June 2001 with trying to set up a meeting with an undercover police officer posing as a 16-year-old girl. He was charged with a misdemeanor crime of "attempted endangerment of the welfare of a child". The charge was dismissed and the record was sealed after he completed six months of pre-trial probation. Ritter suggested at the time that the case, which coincided with his prominent dissent against the buildup to the Iraq War, was a smear campaign designed to silence him.

Ritter was arrested again in November 2009 over communications with a police decoy he met on an Internet chat site. Police said that he exposed himself, via a web camera, after the officer repeatedly identified himself as a 15-year-old girl. The next month, Ritter waived his right to a preliminary hearing and was released on $25,000 unsecured bail. Charges included "unlawful contact with a minor, criminal use of a communications facility, corruption of minors, indecent exposure, possessing instruments of crime, criminal attempt and criminal solicitation". Ritter rejected a plea bargain and was found guilty of all but the criminal attempt count in the Monroe County Court of Common Pleas in Stroudsburg, Pennsylvania, on April 14, 2011. In October 2011, he was sentenced to one and a half to five and a half years in prison. He was sent to Laurel Highlands state prison in Somerset County, Pennsylvania, in March 2012 and paroled in September 2014.

=== Passport seizure ===
In June 2024, US authorities seized Ritter's passport and prevented him from visiting Russia. According to Ritter, three U.S. Customs and Border Protection agents stopped him as he was about to board a flight to Istanbul going to the St. Petersburg International Economic Forum. He said that the agents never showed him a warrant and never gave him a receipt when they seized his passport. Vladimir Putin's spokesman Dmitry Peskov said that "details" about the situation were not clear. Peskov also said that restricting the travel of former intelligence agents "is practiced in almost all countries in relation to former intelligence officers" and that if Ritter was removed from the flight to stop him from speaking in Russia, then it was part of a "frenzied campaign to prevent U.S. citizens from establishing at least some contacts with Russia".

=== FBI raid ===
On August 7, 2024, the FBI conducted a raid of Ritter's home near Albany, New York as part of efforts by the Department of Justice to combat Russian election interference in the 2024 presidential elections.

== Career ==
=== Military background ===
In 1980, Ritter served in the U.S. Army as a private. In May 1984, he was commissioned as an intelligence officer in the United States Marine Corps. He served in this capacity for about 12 years. He was the lead analyst for the Marine Corps Rapid Deployment Force concerning the Soviet invasion of Afghanistan and the Iran–Iraq War. His academic work focused on the Basmachi resistance movement in Soviet Central Asia during the 1920s and 1930s, and on the Basmachi commanders Faizal Maksum and Ibrahim Bek.

During Desert Storm (1991), as a Marine captain, he served as a ballistic missile intelligence analyst under General Norman Schwarzkopf. Ritter filed multiple internal reports challenging Schwarzkopf's claim that the US had destroyed "as many as 16" of Iraq's estimated 20 mobile Scud missile launchers, arguing that they could not be confirmed. In 1992 Ritter was quoted in a New York Times op-ed saying "No mobile Scud launchers were destroyed during the war." He later worked as a security and military consultant for the Fox News Channel network. In an interview with Democracy Now! in 2003 he said he had "a long relationship [...] of an official nature" with the UK's foreign intelligence spy agency MI6.

=== UN Weapons inspector ===
Ritter worked as a weapons inspector for the United Nations Special Commission from 1991 to 1998, which was charged with finding and destroying all weapons of mass destruction and WMD-related manufacturing capabilities in Iraq. He was the chief inspector in fourteen of more than thirty inspection missions in which he participated.

Ritter was among a group of UNSCOM weapons inspectors which regularly took Lockheed U-2 imagery to Israel for analysis, as UNSCOM was not getting sufficient analysis assistance from the United States and the United Kingdom. That was not authorized by UNSCOM, the U-2 jet had been loaned to UNSCOM and caused him to be subjected to criticism and investigation by U.S. authorities. Iraq protested about information being given to Israel.

=== Operation Mass Appeal ===
Beginning in December 1997, Ritter, with the approval of UNSCOM head Richard Butler and other top UNSCOM leaders, began to supply the UK's foreign intelligence service MI6 with documents and briefings on UNSCOM's findings to be used for MI6's propaganda effort dubbed "Operation Mass Appeal": "I was approached by the British intelligence service, which I had, again, a long relationship with, of an official nature, to see if there was any information in the archives of UNSCOM that could be handed to the British, so that they could in turn work it over, determine its veracity, and then seek to plant it in media outlets around the world, in an effort to try to shape the public opinion of those countries, and then indirectly, through, for instance, a report showing up in the Polish press, shape public opinion in Great Britain and the United States. I went to Richard Butler with the request from the British. He said that he supported this, and we initiated a cooperation that was very short-lived. The first reports were passed to the British sometime in February of 1998. There was a detailed planning meeting in June of 1998, and I resigned in August of 1998.[...] This is an operation—Operation Mass Appeal, that had been going on prior to UNSCOM being asked to be the source of particular data, and it's an operation that continued after my resignation."

=== Last weapons inspections in 1998 ===
In January 1998, Ritter's inspection team in Iraq was blocked from some weapons sites by Iraqi officials who said that information obtained from the sites would be used for future planning of attacks. UN Inspectors then left Iraq, shortly before Operation Desert Fox attacks began in December 1998, using information which had been gathered for the purpose of disarmament to identify targets which would reduce Iraq's ability to wage both conventional and possibly unconventional warfare. UN weapons inspectors were thereafter denied access to Iraq. Ritter spoke on the PBS show, The NewsHour with Jim Lehrer: "I think the danger right now is that without effective inspections, without effective monitoring, Iraq can in a very short period of time measured in months, reconstitute chemical and biological weapons, long-range ballistic missiles to deliver these weapons, and even certain aspects of their developing of nuclear weapons program."

When the United States and the UN Security Council failed to take action against Iraq for their ongoing failure to cooperate fully with inspectors (a breach of United Nations Security Council Resolution 1154), Ritter resigned from the United Nations Special Commission on August 26, 1998. In his letter of resignation, Ritter said that the Security Council's reaction to Iraq's decision earlier that month to suspend co-operation with the inspection team made a mockery of the disarmament work. Ritter later said in an interview, that he resigned from his role as a United Nations weapons inspector over inconsistencies between United Nations Security Council Resolution 1154 and how it was implemented: "The investigations had come to a standstill, were making no effective progress, and in order to make effective progress, we really needed the Security Council to step in a meaningful fashion and seek to enforce its resolutions that we're not complying with."

On September 3, 1998, several days after his resignation, Ritter testified before the United States Senate Committee on Armed Services and the United States Senate Committee on Foreign Relations and said that he resigned his position "out of frustration that the United Nations Security Council, and the United States as its most significant supporter, was failing to enforce the post-Gulf War resolutions designed to disarm Iraq." According to him Secretary of State Madeleine K. Albright had supposedly "blocked more inspections in 1997 than Saddam Hussein did," a charge which Albright disputed.

During the testimony on September 3, 1998, Ritter was asked by then-Senator Joe Biden about his position on inspections, which Biden criticized as "confrontation-based policy." According to Barton Gellman, Biden questioned if the inspector was trying to "appropriate the power 'to decide when to pull the trigger' of military force against Iraq," with Biden saying that the Secretary of State would also have to consider the opinion of allies, the United Nations Security Council and public opinion, before any potential intervention in Iraq. Later on, Biden stated that the decision was "above [Ritter's] pay grade." According to Gellman, Senate Democrats joined Biden and "amplified on the Clinton administration's counterattack [against] Scott Ritter" with exceptions such as John Kerry, while Senate Republicans "were unanimous in describing Ritter's disclosures as highly damaging to the credibility of the Clinton administration on one of its core foreign policies."

Ritter's testimony was disputed by Richard Butler, chief UN arms inspector for Iraq, who claimed that Ritter made factual errors and harmed UNSCOM's mission. The previous chief inspector for Iraq, Rolf Ekéus, said that Ritter was "not in a position to know all of the considerations that go into decision making on the commission," and defended Albright's support for UNSCOM. Albright publicly disputed Ritter's claims in a speech, saying "In fact, the United States has been by far the strongest international backer of UNSCOM. We have provided indispensable technical and logistical support. We've pushed and pushed and pushed some more to help UNSCOM break through the smoke screen of lies and deceptions put out by the Iraqi regime."

=== Reception as weapons inspector ===
Butler, Ritter's former UNSCOM boss, said that Ritter "wasn't prescient" in his predictions about WMDs, saying, "When he was the 'Alpha Dog' inspector, then by God, there were more weapons there, and we had to go find them a contention for which he had inadequate evidence. When he became a peacenik, then it was all complete B.S., start to finish, and there were no weapons of mass destruction... that also was a contention for which he had inadequate evidence."

Writing in The New York Times, Matt Bai said that Butler's caveat notwithstanding, Ritter was in fact vindicated about Iraq's lack of WMDs and that the aftermath of the war could be calamitous. Bai described Ritter as the "most determined dissenter and the one with the most on-the-ground intelligence" of the situation in Iraq prior to the war.

However, Bai went on to compare Ritter's insistence during his 2011 trial for sex offenses that his conduct was of no consequence to the wider community—and his unwillingness to consider a plea agreement—to the stridency with which Ritter advocated for his views on Iraq: "If there is a connection between Ritter the activist and Ritter the accused, though, it probably lies in the uncompromising, even heedless way in which he insists on his version of reality, and how he sees himself always as the victim of a system that is self-evidently corrupt. ... the very attribute that made Scott Ritter appear somehow clairvoyant on Iraq—his refusal to accede to everyone else's sense of reality—is the same one that has led him, now, to ruin."

== U.S. policy toward Iraq ==
After his resignation from UNSCOM, Ritter continued to be an outspoken commentator on U.S. policy toward Iraq, particularly with respect to the WMD issue. He became a popular anti-war figure and talk show commentator.

=== Ritter and Operation Desert Fox ===
In a 2005 interview, Ritter criticized the Clinton administration's use of a blocked inspection of a Ba'ath party headquarters to justify Operation Desert Fox, a three-day bombing campaign in December 1998. During the bombing, inspectors were withdrawn from Iraq and they did not return until late 2002. However, in his 1999 book Endgame, Ritter says that he was the one who had originally pushed for the fateful inspection of the Ba'ath party headquarters over the doubts of Butler, his boss, and also planned to use 37 inspectors. It was temporarily canceled because Iraq broke off cooperation in August 1998.

=== Commentary in the post-inspection period ===
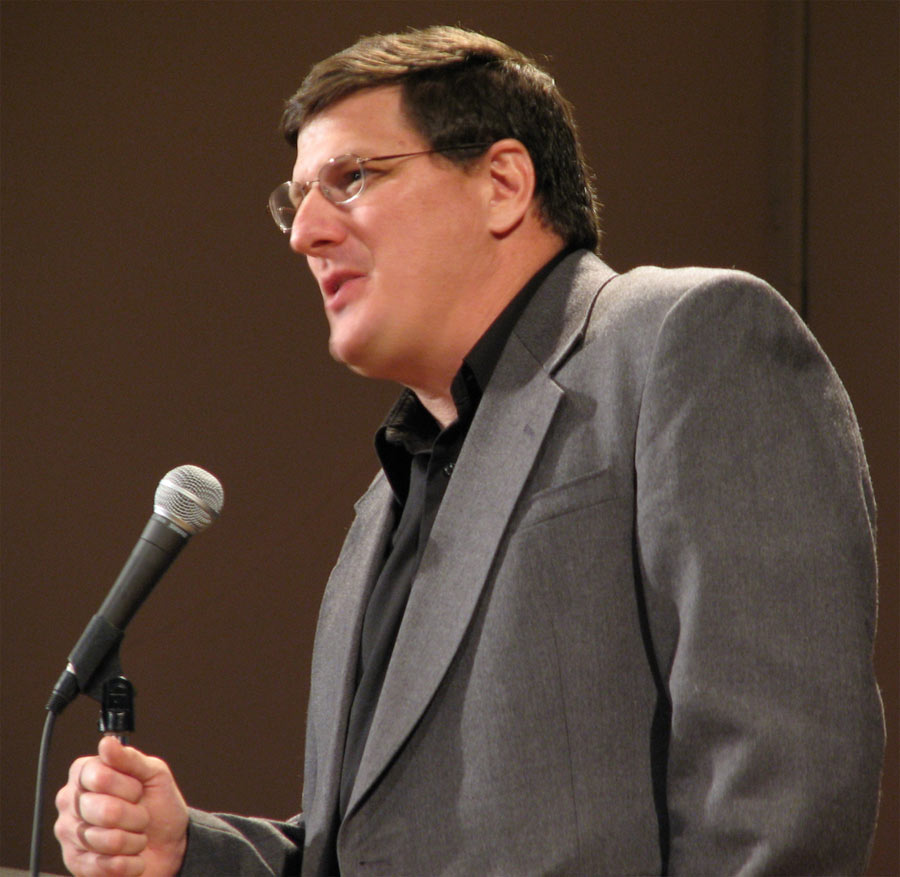
Ritter speaks at SUNY New Paltz on March 16, 2006

In Endgame: Solving the Iraq Problem — Once and For All, Ritter reiterated that Iraq had obstructed the work of inspectors and attempted to hide and preserve essential elements for restarting WMD programs at a later date. However, he also expressed frustration at alleged attempts by the Central Intelligence Agency (CIA) to infiltrate UNSCOM and use the inspectors as a means of gathering intelligence with which to pursue regime change in Iraq–a violation of the terms under which UNSCOM operated, and the very rationale the Iraqi government had given in restricting the inspector's activities in 1998. In the book's conclusion, he criticized the U.S. policy of containment in the absence of inspections as inadequate to prevent Iraq's re-acquisition of WMD's in the long term. Ritter also rejected the notion of removing Saddam Hussein's regime by force. Instead, he advocated a policy of diplomatic engagement, leading to gradual normalization of international relations with Iraq in return for diplomatic recognition of Kuwait, Kurdish autonomy and de-escalation of tensions with Israel.

Ritter again promoted a conciliatory approach toward Iraq in the 2000 documentary In Shifting Sands: The Truth About UNSCOM and the Disarming of Iraq, which he wrote and directed. The film is about the history of the UNSCOM investigations through interviews and video footage of inspection missions. In the film, Ritter argues that Iraq is a "defanged tiger" and that the inspections were successful in eliminating significant Iraqi WMD capabilities. (For more see below under "Documentary".)

In 2002, Ritter traveled to Iraq to address the Iraqi Parliament as a private citizen. He told the parliament that the U.S. was about to make an "historical mistake" and urged it to allow inspections to resume.

=== Iraq War predictions ===
Just after the coalition invasion of Iraq was launched but prior to troops arriving in Baghdad, British Prime Minister Tony Blair told the Parliament of the United Kingdom that the United States and the United Kingdom believed they had "sufficient forces" in Iraq. At the same time Ritter offered an opposing view on Portuguese radio station TSF: "The United States is going to leave Iraq with its tail between its legs, defeated. It is a war we can not win... We do not have the military means to take over Baghdad and for this reason I believe the defeat of the United States in this war is inevitable... Every time we confront Iraqi troops we may win some tactical battles, as we did for ten years in Vietnam, but we will not be able to win this war, which in my opinion is already lost."

=== Commentary on Iraq's lack of WMDs ===
Despite identifying as a Republican and having voted for George W. Bush in 2000, by 2002, Ritter was an outspoken critic of the Bush administration's claims that Iraq possessed significant WMD stocks or manufacturing capabilities, the primary rationale given for the U.S. invasion of Iraq in March 2003. Prior to the war, Ritter said that the U.S. and British governments were using the presence of WMD's in Iraq as a political excuse for war. His views at the time are summarized in War on Iraq: What Team Bush Doesn't Want You To Know a 2002 publication which consists largely of an interview between Ritter and anti-war activist William Rivers Pitt.

=== Later statements on Iraq ===
In February 2005, writing on Al Jazeera's website, Ritter wrote that the "Iraqi resistance" is a "genuine grassroots national liberation movement," and "History will eventually depict as legitimate the efforts of the Iraqi resistance to destabilize and defeat the American occupation forces and their imposed Iraqi collaborationist government." In 2012, Ritter said that the U.S. was "bankrupt, morally and fiscally, because of this war. The United States is the laughingstock of the world".

=== Documentary ===
Ritter's documentary In Shifting Sands was released in 2001. It argues that Iraq did not possess weapons of mass destruction because of the UN weapons inspection program. According to The Washington Times, his documentary was partially financed by Iraqi American businessman Shakir al Khafaji. Al-Khafaji pleaded guilty to multiple felony charges in 2004 for his involvement in the U.N. Oil-for-Food scandal.

Ritter said that there was no quid pro quo with Al-Khafaji and he told Al-Khafaji the financing "can have no connection to the Iraqi government". Ritter was asked "how he would characterize anyone suggesting that Mr. Khafaji was offering allocations in [his] name", he replied: "I'd say that person's a __ liar... and tell him to come over here so I can kick his _."

== Other views and commentary ==
=== U.S. policy toward Iran ===
On February 6, 2006, in the James A. Little Theater in Santa Fe, New Mexico, Ritter talked about a U.S. war with Iran: "We just don't know when, but it's going to happen," and said that after the U.N. Security Council will have found no evidence of WMD, then Under Secretary of State John Bolton "will deliver a speech that has already been written. It says America cannot allow Iran to threaten the United States and we must unilaterally defend ourselves." and continued "How do I know this? I've talked to Bolton's speechwriter".

Ritter's book Target Iran: The Truth About the White House's Plans for Regime Change was published in 2006. Nathan Guttman in his review for The Forward said Ritter accused the "pro-Israel lobby of dual loyalty and 'outright espionage'". Ritter said that Israel was pushing the Bush administration into war with Iran. He accused the pro-Israel lobby of invoking the Holocaust and of making false claims of antisemitism. Ritter told The Forward "at the end of the day, I would like to believe that most of American Jews will side with America."

Con Coughlin in The Daily Telegraph wrote about Ritter's writings of the government in Iran. Coughlin wrote that Ritter said "that the Bush administration is in danger of making the same mistake over Iran that it did during the build-up to the Iraq war, namely getting the facts to fit the administration's policy of effecting regime change in Tehran". Coughlin said, Ritter concedes the "measures the Iranians have taken in pursuit of nuclear glory" which include the "concealing the existence of key nuclear facilities".

=== Russian invasion of Ukraine ===
In April 2022, shortly after the start of the Russia's invasion of Ukraine, Ritter tweeted that the National Police of Ukraine was responsible for the Bucha massacre and U.S. President Joe Biden was a "war criminal" for "seeking to shift blame for the Bucha murders" to Russia. Ritter apparently had not commented previously on Ukraine, or Russia. Human Rights Watch found evidence linking the killings to the Russian military. He was suspended from Twitter for violating its rule on "harassment and abuse" afterwards but his account was reinstated the next day. His strongly pro-Russian position quickly attracted negative international attention. In 2022, he became a contributor to Russian government-owned media outlets RT and Sputnik. He compared Ukraine to a "rabid dog" which needed to be shot. He compared the treatment of Russians under Ukrainian law to Nazi Germany's treatment of Jews. In October 2022, he posted a provocative tweet about Bucha, "Bucha was a war crime, Ukraine did it", to test the reaction of Twitter. DisInfoChronicle, a website of the NGO Detector Media which claims to refute Russian disinformation, wrote that Ritter was being used by Russia to "promote narratives needed by the Kremlin".

In July 2022, the Ukrainian Center for Countering Disinformation included Ritter on a list of what it called Russian propagandists. In April 2022 and April 2023 Ritter said that Russia was winning the war. American government-owned news outlet Polygraph.info wrote that Ritter's claims about Russia winning the war and about the Bucha massacre were false. In May 2023, Ritter began a book tour of Kazan, Irkutsk, and Yekaterinburg for his most recent book, Disarmament in the time of the Perestroika, which examines nuclear weapons agreements between Russia and the United States. According to Euronews, Ritter predicted that Ukraine would lose the war.

In January 2024, Ritter visited Chechnya, addressing thousands of Chechen fighters in a central square in Grozny, the capital. BBC journalist Francis Scarr called it "one of the most surreal moments of the war yet.[...] Scott Ritter has turned up in Chechnya and spoken in broken Russian (some of which I couldn't make out) to thousands of Ramzan Kadyrov's fighters about his efforts to strengthen the 'friendship between Chechnya and America'." In his speech, Ritter again repeated his belief that Russia will win its war with Ukraine. After Ritter's speech in Grozny, where he was being welcomed as a guest of the Chechenya, Kadyrov made a public statement that he had given Ritter a list of 20 Ukrainian prisoners-of-war he was prepared to release in return for a lifting of US sanctions on him and his family. Kadyrov called his public statement "trolling" and said that it had not been serious. Later in January 2024, Ritter arrived in the Russian-occupied Kherson Oblast region in Ukraine, guarded by GRU agents, and spoke with collaborationist governor Vladimir Saldo. The Kyiv Post denounced Ritter's visit as "illegal" due to the lack of Ukrainian consent.

== Selected bibliography ==
- Disarmament in the Time of Perestroika: Arms Control and the End of the Soviet Union, Clarity Press, 2022, ISBN 1949762610
- Scorpion King: America's Suicidal Embrace of Nuclear Weapons from FDR to Trump (Paperback), Clarity Press, 2020; 2nd revised edition, ISBN 1949762181
- Deal of the Century: How Iran Blocked the West's Road to War (Paperback), Clarity Press, 2017, ISBN 0997896507
- Dangerous Ground: America's Failed Arms Control Policy, from FDR to Obama (Hardcover), 2009 ISBN 1568583990
- Waging Peace: The Art of War for the Antiwar Movement, Nation Books, 2007, ISBN 1-56858-328-1
- Target Iran: The Truth About the White House's Plans for Regime Change (Hardcover), Nation Books, 2006, ISBN 1-56025-936-1
- Iraq Confidential: The Untold Story of the Intelligence Conspiracy to Undermine the UN and Overthrow Saddam Hussein (Hardcover), Foreword by Seymour Hersh, Nation Books, 2006, ISBN 1-56025-852-7
- Frontier Justice: Weapons of Mass Destruction and the Bushwhacking of America Context Books, 2003, ISBN 1-893956-47-4
- War on Iraq: What Team Bush Doesn't Want You to Know (with William Rivers Pitt). Context Books, 2002, ISBN 1-893956-38-5
- Endgame: Solving the Iraq Problem — Once and For All (Hardcover) Simon & Schuster, 1999, ISBN 0-684-86485-1; (paperback) Diane Pub Co, 2004, ISBN 0-7567-7659-7

== See also ==
- Eva Bartlett
- Jackson Hinkle
- Patrick Lancaster
- Gonzalo Lira
- Graham Phillips (journalist)
- Operation Rockingham
- Russian information war against Ukraine
