= Alexander Coker =

Alexander Coker (born 1969) was formerly a Chief Inspector of the Chemical Weapons team in Iraq, while working for the United Nations Monitoring, Verification and Inspection Commission (UNMOVIC). Prior to that he held various other posts at UNMOVIC and had been seconded from the British Government to carry out work for UNMOVIC’s predecessor, the United Nations Special Commission (UNSCOM).

He holds a Ph.D from King's College London, where he published work on the stability of particular chemical systems.

It is believed Dr. Coker was a leading contributor to the chemical section of UNMOVIC’s working document on Iraq’s Unresolved Disarmament Issues and to the revision of the list of dual-use chemical items subject to notification by Iraq, under the Export/Import Mechanism approved by Security Council Resolution 1051.

Under Dr. Coker’s leadership, what is now known to have been the last remnants of chemical weapons (artillery shells containing mustard gas) were destroyed at Al Muthanna State Establishment (Iraq's former chemical weapons facility) - the shells were apparently part of an old stock pile remaining from prior to the first Gulf War.

Dr. Coker is mentioned in the evidence of the Hutton Inquiry investigation into the circumstances surrounding the death of Dr. David Kelly and by the Verification Research, Training and Information Centre (VERTIC).
