= Shakir al Khafaji =

Iraqi-American businessman (born 1955)

Shakir al Khafaji (born 1955) is a Detroit-based Iraqi-American businessman.
