= Muthana State Establishment =

Iraqi research facility

Coordinates: 33°51′27″N 43°49′47″E

Location of Muthana state establishment

Muthana State Establishment or Muthanna (Arabic: منشأة المثنى العامة) (also known for its code-name Project 922 and cover name State Enterprise for Pesticide Production (SEPP)) was Iraq's main chemical weapons research, development, and production facility. It is located in Saladin Governorate 40 km south west of Samarra, 140 km north west of Baghdad. This mega facility covering an area 100 km^{2}, contained three main production areas.

The site operated continuously from 1983 to 1991, producing thousands of tons of precursors and chemical warfare agents, including mustard gas, sarin, tabun, and VX. The site was heavily bombed during the Gulf War. From 1992 to 1994 the UNSCOM Chemical Destruction Group operated at this site to eliminate remaining precursor materials, destroy production plants and equipment, and hydrolyse or burn remaining chemical warfare agents. Muthana was also the initial location for Iraq's biological weapons program (1985-1987).

== Foundation ==
Muthana State Establishment was built in the early 1980s under the guise of a pesticide production plant dubbed "The State Enterprise for Pesticide Production" or "SEPP" (its name changed later to Muthana State Establishment).

This Iraqi chemical weapon program was assisted by a wide variety of companies and governments, with the largest contributions from West Germany.

German companies helped Iraq to build Muthana facilities such as laboratories, an administrative building, bunkers in the early 1980s. Other German companies provided Iraq with 1,027 tons of precursors of mustard gas, sarin, tabun, and tear gasses in all. This work allowed Iraq to produce 150 tons of mustard agent and 60 tons of tabun in 1983 and 1984 respectively, continuing throughout the decade.

== Production ==
Between 1981 and 1991, Muthana establishment produced over 3,857 tons of chemical weapons agents part of them has been used against Iranian forces and civilian Kurdish.

=== Mustard ===
Production of mustard started at 10 tons of agent production in 1981 and increased around 80-100 tons per year until 1985 when the facility produced 350 tons. In 1987 Iraq produced almost 900 tons of mustard agents and 500 tons in 1988.

=== Tabun ===
Muthana facility produced between 60 and 80 tons of tabun annually between 1984 and 1986.

=== Sarin ===
In 1984 Muthana produced 5 tons of sarin. Production of sarin constantly increased. In 1987 and 1988 Muthana facility produced 209 and 394 tons of sarin, respectively.

=== VX ===
Muthana produced 2.5 tons of VX in 1988 before ending production due to the end of the Iran-Iraq War.

== Gulf War ==
Al Muthanna essentially ceased production in December 1990 and refocused resources on dispersing Chemical Weapons stockpiles and equipment for protection against the anticipated bombing campaigns, which started in January 1991. During the Gulf War, production laboratories and facilities were destroyed. In addition one storage bunker was destroyed because of secondary explosion, and two others bunkers were severely damaged.

== Between 1991 and 2003 ==
Between 1992 and 1994 the Muthana site was the main collection and destruction site for chemical warfare agents, precursor chemicals, and chemical production equipment. Between 1992 and 1994, the UNSCOM destroyed 30,000 pieces of ordnance, 480,000 liters of chemical agents, and more than 2 million liters of chemical precursors. Eventually, most of the facilities at the complex were destroyed or sold for scrap.

Munitions that had been considered unstable and too dangerous for destruction were sealed into barrels and buried in two sealed cruciform bunkers. When the bunkers damaged by coalition airstrikes collapsed, unaccounted Chemical Weapons equipment and munitions were concealed in the debris.

After their destruction in coalition airstrikes of February 1991, access to the buildings had been considered impossible due to safety considerations. Nevertheless, UNSCOM decided that it should make a major effort to excavate the site. From 24 February to 10 March 1996, UNSCOM 129B, an international team of 26 inspectors, excavated six sections of buildings at Muthanna and searched a number of other areas and buildings. During this mission, the team discovered and retrieved documents and computer discs. In addition, the team removed some 80 munitions and components, including 122 mm chemical artillery shells and 155 mm "binary" chemical artillery shells.
