= United Nations Special Commission =

UN-led inspections of Iraq

United Nations Special Commission (UNSCOM) was an inspection regime created by the United Nations to ensure Iraq's compliance with policies concerning Iraqi production and use of weapons of mass destruction after the Gulf War. Between 1991 and 1997 its director was Rolf Ekéus; from 1997 to 1999 its director was Richard Butler.

== Summary ==
United Nations Special Commission (UNSCOM) was an inspection regime created with the adoption of United Nations Security Council Resolution 687 in April 1991 to oversee Iraq's compliance with the destruction of Iraqi chemical, biological, and missile weapons facilities and to cooperate with the International Atomic Energy Agency's efforts to eliminate nuclear weapon facilities all in the aftermath of the Gulf War. The UNSCOM inspection regime was packaged with several other UN Security Council requirements, namely, that Iraq's ruling regime formally recognize Kuwait as an independent state and pay out war reparations for the destruction inflicted in the Gulf War, including the firing of Kuwaiti oil supplies and destruction of public infrastructure. Until the UN Security Council saw that Iraq's weapons programs had been aborted and Iraqi leaders had allowed monitoring systems to be installed, the UN's aforementioned sanctions would continue to be imposed on Iraq.

The commission found corroborating evidence that Rihab Rashid Taha, an Iraqi microbiologist educated in England, had produced biological weapons for Iraq in the 1980s. The destruction of proscribed weapons and the associated facilities was carried out mainly by Iraq, under constant supervision by UNSCOM.

Inspectors withdrew in 1998, and disbanded the following year amid allegations that the United States had used the commission's resources to spy on the Iraqi military.

The successor of the United Nations Special Commission was the United Nations Monitoring, Verification and Inspection Commission.

== History ==
The United Nations Special Commission (UNSCOM) was headed by Rolf Ekéus and later Richard Butler. During several visits to Iraq by the United Nations Special Committee (UNSCOM), set up after the 1990 invasion of Kuwait to inspect Iraqi weapons facilities, weapons inspectors were told by Rihab Rashid Taha that the al-Hakam germ warfare center was a chicken-feed plant. "There were a few things that were peculiar about this animal-feed production plant," Charles Duelfer, UNSCOM's deputy executive chairman, later told reporters, "beginning with the extensive air defenses surrounding it."

=== 1991–1995 ===
The powers given to UNSCOM inspectors in Iraq were: "unrestricted freedom of movement without advance notice in Iraq"; the "right to unimpeded access to any site or facility for the purpose of the on-site inspection...whether such site or facility be above or below ground"; "the right to request, receive, examine, and copy any record data, or information...relevant to" UNSCOM's activities; and the "right to take and analyze samples of any kind as well as to remove and export samples for off-site analysis".

Acceptance of the intrusion of the UNSCOM's inspectors on the part of the Iraqi regime was slow coming. But with the threat of punitive military action looming from the international community, and particularly the U.S., Saddam Hussein begrudgingly allowed UNSCOM's inspectors into the country to begin their work.

From August 1991 the U.S. government made a Lockheed U-2 reconnaissance aircraft available to UNSCOM. The imagery was analysed by U.S. analysts, but the volume of imagery exceeded analysis capacity. With UNSCOM authority, Scott Ritter and some other UNSCOM weapons inspectors also regularly took Lockheed U-2 imagery to Israel for analysis. Iraq protested about the supply of such information to Israel.

Between 1991 and 1995, UN inspectors uncovered a massive program to develop biological and nuclear weapons. A large amount of equipment was confiscated and destroyed. Iraq by and large refused to cooperate with UNSCOM and its inspections as mandated by UN SC Res. 687 until June 1992, ten months after deadline, at which time the Iraqi government submitted "full, final and complete reports" on all of its weapons of mass destruction programs. These reports, however, were found to be incomplete and deficient, and at the same time UN inspectors were subjected to harassment and threats on the part of the Iraqi regime.

United Nations Security Council Resolution 699 was also passed in 1991, declaring that Iraq was responsible for all funding of UNSCOM's inspections in Iraq.

In 1995, UNSCOM's principal weapons inspector Dr. Rod Barton showed Taha documents obtained by UNSCOM from Israel that showed the Iraqi government had just purchased 10 tons of growth media from a British company called Oxoid. Growth media is a mixture of sugar, proteins and minerals that allows microscopic life to grow. It is used in hospitals, where swabs from patients are placed in dishes containing growth media for diagnostic purposes. Iraq's hospital consumption of growth media was just 200 kg a year; yet in 1988, Iraq imported 39 tons of it.

Shown this evidence by UNSCOM, Taha admitted to inspectors that she had grown 19,000 litres of botulism toxin; 8,000 litres of anthrax; 2,000 litres of aflatoxins, which can cause liver cancer; clostridium perfringens, a bacterium that can cause gas gangrene; and ricin, a castor bean derivative which can kill by inhibiting protein synthesis. She also admitted conducting research into cholera, salmonella, foot and mouth disease, and camel pox, a disease that uses the same growth techniques as smallpox, but which is safer for researchers to work with. It was because of the discovery of Taha's work with camel pox that the US and British intelligence services feared Saddam Hussein may have been planning to weaponize the smallpox virus. Iraq had a smallpox outbreak in the 1970s and UNSCOM scientists believe the government would have retained contaminated material.

UNSCOM learned that, in August 1990, after Iraq's invasion of Kuwait, Taha's team was ordered to set up a program to weaponize the biological agents. By January 1991, a team of 100 scientists and support staff had filled 157 bombs and 16 missile warheads with botulin toxin, and 50 bombs and five missile warheads with anthrax. In an interview with the BBC, Taha denied the Iraqi government had weaponized the bacteria. "We never intended to use it," she told journalist Jane Corbin of the BBC's Panorama program. "We never wanted to cause harm or damage to anybody." UNSCOM found the munitions dumped in a river near al-Hakam. UNSCOM also discovered that Taha's team had conducted inhalation experiments on donkeys from England and on beagles from Germany. The inspectors seized photographs showing beagles having convulsions inside sealed containers.

=== 1996 ===
The al-Hakam germ warfare center, headed by the British-educated Iraqi biologist Dr. Rihab Rashid Taha, was blown up by UNSCOM in 1996. According to a 1999 report from the U.S. Defense Intelligence Agency, the normally mild-mannered Taha exploded into violent rages whenever UNSCOM questioned her about al-Hakam, shouting, screaming and, on one occasion, smashing a chair, while insisting that al-Hakam was a chicken-feed plant.

Iraq charged that the commission was a cover for US espionage and refused UNSCOM access to certain sites, such as Baath Party headquarters. Although Ekéus has said that he resisted attempts at such espionage, many allegations have since been made against the agency commission under Butler, charges which Butler has denied. Within the UN establishment in Iraq, UNSCOM was not without its critics, with the UN's humanitarian staff informally calling the inspectors 'UN-Scum'. In return, the UN's humanitarian staff were called "bunny-huggers".

Also in 1996, the Iraqi ruling regime agreed to the terms of United Security Council Resolution 986, an oil-for-supplies agreement in which Iraq was allowed to sell $2 billion worth of oil every six months as a ways to purchase supplies for its increasingly impoverished and malnourished population. This agreement also allowed the UN to oversee the use and management of oil revenues, and to see that some of the funds went to pay war reparations and for the work of UNSCOM in Iraq during this period. The distribution of supplies purchased with oil revenues was also to be supervised by UN inspectors to ensure fair and equal distribution throughout the Iraqi population.

=== 1998 Airstrikes ===
On the evening of 15 December 1998 the Security Council convened to consider two letters from weapons inspectors. The IAEA report by Mohamed El Baradei stated that Iraq "has provided the necessary level of cooperation to enable... [our] activities to be completed efficiently and effectively". The UNSCOM report, authored by Richard Butler, deplored the restrictions, lack of disclosure, and concealment. While conceding that "[i]n statistical terms, the majority of the inspections of facilities and sites under the ongoing monitoring system were carried out with Iraq's cooperation," his letter listed a number of instances where unspecified "undeclared dual-capable items" had been discovered, and where inspections had been held up so that buildings could be cleared of sensitive material.

Since Operation Desert Fox had already begun at the time of the meeting (just hours after the inspectors had been evacuated), the Security Council debated about who was to blame for the military action, rather than whether they should authorize it. The Iraqi representative said:

I speak to you now while rockets and bombs are falling on the cities and the villages of Iraq... At a time when the Security Council... was discussing [the] reports..., and before the Council reached any conclusion on this subject, the United States and Britain launched their attack against Iraq. The two Powers requested a suspension of the informal meeting of the Security Council and their pretext for aggression was that one of the two reports – the UNSCOM report – emphasized the lack of full cooperation by Iraq with UNSCOM... Time and again we have warned against the partiality and lack of objectivity of the United Nations Special Commission... The UNSCOM Executive Chairman singled out in his report yesterday five incidents out of a total of 300 inspection operations... The exaggerated uproar about Iraqi weapons of mass destruction is nothing but a great lie.

The Russian ambassador added:

We believe that although there are certain problems..., the current crisis was created artificially... On the night of 15 December this year, [Butler] presented a report that gave a distorted picture of the real state of affairs and concluded that there was a lack of full cooperation on the part of Iraq. That conclusion was not borne out by the facts. Without any consultations with the Security Council, Richard Butler then evacuated the entire Special Commission staff from Iraq. At the same time, there was an absolutely unacceptable leak of the report to the communications media, which received the text before the members of the Security Council themselves... It is symbolic that precisely at the time when Richard Butler... was attempting to defend the conclusions reached in his report, we were informed about the strike against Iraq, and the justification for that unilateral act was precisely the report which had been presented by the Executive Chairman of the Special Commission.

The view of the Council was split, with several countries placing the responsibility on Iraq. The United States declared that "Iraq's policy of unremitting defiance and non-compliance necessitated the resort to military force". The United Kingdom stated that the objectives of the action were "to degrade Iraq's capability to build and use weapons of mass destruction, and to diminish the military threat Iraq poses to its neighbours. The targets chosen, therefore, are targets connected with his military capability, his weapons of mass destruction and his ability to threaten his neighbours."

=== 1999: End of UNSCOM ===
In December 1999, the UN Security Council passed Resolution 1284, replacing UNSCOM with the United Nations Monitoring, Verification and Inspection Commission, also known as UNMOVIC. Four countries – among them Russia, France and China – abstained from voting on Res. 1284, which led the Iraqi regime to reject the resolution because they saw the resolution as a way for the UN to claim Iraq as a "protectorate".

UNSCOM's intention of identifying and eliminating Iraqi weapons programs resulted in numerous successes, illustrating the "value of a system approach to biological arms verification". But the overall effect of the UN sanctions on Iraqi in the 1990s had some negative effects on the Iraqi people. Graham-Brown (2000) and Halliday (1999) argued the sanctions caused malnutrition rates among Iraqis to increase and infant mortality rates to soar, exacting a heavy toll on ordinary Iraqi civilians not part of Saddam's patrimonial "shadow state". However, research by Dyson nd Cetorelli (2017) demonstrated that claims of a rise in infant mortality rates and malnutrition rates among Iraqi civilians due to sanctions were due to manipulation of a 1999 UNICEF survey by Saddam's regime, noting that comprehensive surveys after 2003 found no evidence that UN sanctions caused a rise in child mortality rates.

== Allegations of CIA infiltration of UNSCOM ==
Evidence that UNSCOM had been used by US intelligence to penetrate Iraqi security and track President Saddam Hussein's movements emerged in January 1999. An investigation by The Washington Post claimed that CIA engineers, working as UN technicians, installed equipment to spy on Iraqi sites without Butler's knowledge, and that this explained the unidentified "burst transmissions" that had been noted by the inspectors.

Former UN weapons inspector Scott Ritter later accused some UNSCOM personnel of spying, and also alleged that the purpose of the spying was to target Saddam in the bombing. Butler, on the other hand, denied allegations that foreign intelligence agencies "piggybacked" UNSCOM and questioned the factual accuracy of several of Ritter's statements.

== Ritter on Iraq's WMDs after 1998 ==
In June 1999, Ritter said:

When you ask the question, "Does Iraq possess militarily viable biological or chemical weapons?" the answer is "NO!" It is a resounding "NO". Can Iraq produce today chemical weapons on a meaningful scale? No! Can Iraq produce biological weapons on a meaningful scale? No! Ballistic missiles? No! It is "no" across the board. So from a qualitative standpoint, Iraq has been disarmed. Iraq today possesses no meaningful weapons of mass destruction capability.

== Butler resigned 1999 ==
Butler resigned from UNSCOM on 30 June 1999.

== See also ==
- In Shifting Sands: The Truth About Unscom and the Disarming of Iraq – documentary film directed by Scott Ritter
- Iraq disarmament crisis and Iraq disarmament timeline 1990–2003
- UNSCOM personnel: Rolf Ekéus, Richard Butler (diplomat), Charles A. Duelfer, Scott Ritter, Corinne Heraud, Alexander Coker, David Kelly
