= Presidency =

Governmental entity surrounding a president

A presidency is an administration or the executive, the collective administrative and governmental entity that exists around an office of president of a state or nation. Although often the executive branch of government, and often personified by a single elected person who holds the office of "president", in practice, the presidency includes a much larger collective of people, such as chiefs of staff, advisers and other bureaucrats. Although often led by a single person, presidencies can also be of a collective nature, such as the presidency of the European Union is held on a rotating basis by the various national governments of the member states. Alternatively, the term presidency can also be applied to the governing authority of some churches, and may even refer to the holder of a non-governmental office of president in a corporation, business, charity, university, etc. or the institutional arrangement around them. For example, "the presidency of the Red Cross refused to support his idea." Rules and support to discourage vicarious liability leading to unnecessary pressure and the early termination of term have not been clarified. These may not be as yet supported by state let initiatives. Contributory liability and fraud may be the two most common ways to become removed from term of office and/or to prevent re-election.

== Presidency by country ==
=== American presidency ===
Flag of the president of the United States

In the United States, the presidency is headed by the president, who has many roles, such as:

- Chief of state: the chief public representative of a country, who may also be the head of government.
- Commander in chief of the Armed Forces: the civilian commander of a nation's military forces.
- Chief legislator: gives information to Congress to consider through the state of the Union address and recommendations for consideration of new statutes.
- Chief diplomat: the president is both a national spokesman and a world leader. As representative of a country of immigrants with ties around the globe, the president is expected to defend America's security and economic interests, and also to promote democratic principles and human rights internationally. Several presidents whose domestic policies were frustrated by an uncooperative Congress have focused their attention on foreign affairs, where their power and freedom to determine policy was less hindered.
- Chief executive: the president serves as the government's chief administrative officer, with the responsibility to see that the laws are faithfully executed. The president also appoints officials, with the advice and consent of the Senate.

The United States holds their presidential election every four years. At the national convention, major and minor political parties nominate candidates for the president and vice president. Citizens then vote on the presidential and vice presidential candidate of their choice. However, these votes do not elect a candidate directly. Instead, the votes are sent to the Electoral College, and cast ballots for presidential electors. The candidate with a majority in the Electoral College will win the presidential or vice presidential election.

=== Brazilian presidency ===
Flag of the president of Brazil

As a republic with a presidential executive, Brazil grants significant powers to the president. According to the Federal Constitution, the president effectively controls the executive branch, represents the country abroad, and appoints the cabinet and, with the approval of the Federal Senate, the judges for the Supreme Federal Court. The president is also the commander-in-chief of the armed forces.

The president also have significant lawmaking powers, exercised either by proposing laws to the National Congress, or else by using Medidas Provisórias (provisional measures), an instrument with the force of law that the president can enact in cases of urgency and necessity, except to make changes to some areas of law (provisional measures cannot be used to change criminal law, electoral law, to abolish individual rights or to alter the fundamental framework of the State — the Separation of Powers and the Federal Republic). A provisional measure comes into effect immediately, before Congress votes on it, and remains in force for up to 60 days unless Congress votes to rescind it. This 60-day period can be extended once, up to a maximum of 120 days. If Congress, on the other hand, votes to approve the provisional measure, it becomes an actual law, with changes decided by the legislative branch. The provisional measure expires at the end of the 60-day period (or 120-day, in case of extension), or sooner, if rejected by one of the Houses of Congress.

=== Colombian presidency ===
Flag of the president of Colombia

In Colombia the presidency is headed by the president, who has many roles, such as: The head of state and head of government of the Republic of Colombia. The president heads the executive branch of the national government and is the commander-in-chief of the Colombian Armed Forces. The president is directly elected through Universal Suffrage for a period of four years, along with the vice president. According to article 125, ratified in 2018, no person who has been elected for a presidential term can be elected for a second.

=== Finnish presidency ===
Flag of the president of Finland

The Finnish presidency is based on a Parliamentary republic system. The president's powers were curtailed in the constitutional reform in 2000, and yet further in 2011. Currently the president leads the Finnish foreign policy together with the cabinet. EU affairs, however, fall to the prime minister's authority. The president has little domestic power. The president can dissolve the parliament, but only at the prime minister's request. The president can choose not to ratify a bill, but this only returns it to parliament, which must then approve the bill again in order for it to become a law without the president's signature. The president's power to appoint officials has been reduced, but still appoints all military officers as well as judges. The president is the commander-in-chief of the Finnish Defence Forces. The president also has the power to pardon anyone convicted of a crime. With the curtailment of the president's formal powers, many analysts have emphasized the president's position as a leader of values.

=== French presidency ===
Emblem of France

The French presidency is based on a semi-presidential system where both a president and a prime minister are active participants in the day-to-day administration of the state. France's president appoints a prime minister, who then forms a government. France's presidency includes the three traditional branches: the Executive, Judicial and Legislative, but it also includes a fourth branch called the Constitutional Council, which determines the constitutionality of new laws.

Since the formation of the French Fifth Republic in 1958, France has had a semi-presidential system. Historically France has not had a semi-presidential system. For example, between 1875 and 1958 during the French Third Republic and French Fourth Republic, France's presidency was based on a Parliamentary System.

=== Irish presidency ===
The Office of the President of Ireland (Irish: Uachtarán na hÉireann) is outlined in Ireland's constitution. The president is elected by direct popular vote. Suffrage is universal for anyone eighteen and older and is determined that anyone who is eligible to vote for members of Dáil Éireann (the lower house of parliament), is eligible to vote for the president. The vote is conducted by secret ballot. Every citizen who is thirty-five or older is eligible to be nominated for the presidency; and must be nominated by either twenty or more representatives from Houses of the Oireachtas (the national parliament) or four administrative counties. The term of office is for seven years and no president may serve more than two terms. The president must reside in or near Dublin. The president acts as chief diplomat and represents all the people of Ireland in their engagements home or abroad. The president does not have executive power, and only enacts their powers under the discretion of the rest of the government. However, the president has ultimate discretion in some instances, an example of which would be that the president can refer a bill to the Supreme Court to rule on its constitutionality. Another duty of the president is to appoint the Taoiseach (prime minister), as nominated by the Dáil Éireann. The president can then appoint other ministers to the government by the nomination of the Taoiseach. The president is the commander of the Defence Forces. The President of Ireland since 11 November 2025 is Catherine Connolly, who was elected in 24 October 2025.

=== Italian presidency ===
Flag of the president of Italy

The Italian presidency is based on a Parliamentary republic system, where both a president and a prime minister are active participants in administration of the state, but where the de facto the prime minister holds the majority of power, while the president remains the nominal head of state.

The president is intended to represent national unity and guarantee that Italian politics complies with the Constitution. Although the prime minister is considered the head of government, the formal Italian order of precedence lists the office as being ceremonially the fourth most important Italian state office. It also is considered the de facto leader of the Italian government. The prime minister appoints Council of Ministers and Cabinet officials to their rightful area of office. The president of the Republic gives wide support across all political parties. The president of the Republic appoints Italy's prime minister and accepts advice from the prime minister. The Italian government includes the traditional three branches: Executive, Judicial and Legislative.

=== Australian chief executive ===
Australia has a constitutional monarchy – a form of government in which a monarch acts as the head of state within the parameters of a constitution. The constitution could be written, unconfined or blended. It uses what is called a "Parliamentary System of Government," one that administers the executive branch which then gets Democratic legitimacy from the Legislature. The Legislature in Australia is defined as a "Bicameral Parliament." The Executive branch of the Australian government headed by a Federal Executive Council, in which the Governor General is advised by the prime minister and Ministers of State.

=== German presidency ===
The head of state is the president of Germany, where the president completes a five-year term and can be reelected after that five-year term for only one time. He has similar roles like to other countries. He represents Germany as the Commander-in-chief of the military, He has the role of being the Minister of Defense and Germany cannot declare a state of war without the approval of the president. The president then appoints what is called a chancellor, which is known as Germany's Head of state. Which the role is pretty comparable to a prime minister like in other countries. There are many roles the chancellor has here are a few of them. The chancellor provides basic law and for their party, it determines the composition of the Federal Cabinet. But the president then gives recommendation on appointing and dismissing Cabinet Minister, through the Federal Cabinet. The chancellor then goes by three main principles. The first is called the Chancellor Principles, who is responsible for all government policies. The second one is called The Principle of ministerial autonomy in which the chancellor prepares everything for the legislative and proposes other laws threw the Cabinet and the third one is called Cabinet Principle were this calls for disagreements between federal ministers over Jurisdictional or Budgeting relative things, in which is settled by the Cabinet. Germany has what is called a Federal legislative power which is divided between the Bundestag and the Bundesrat. The Bundestag is elected by the German people. To were the Bundestrat represents the regional states. It seems that Bundestag is more powerful than the Bundesrat. The reason is because bundestag has more powers and responsibilities of that the states given to it. The judicial branch of Germany has three courts which are the Ordinary Courts, Specialized Courts and the Constitutional Courts. Ordinary courts, deal with criminal and civil cases. Specialized Courts, deal with administrative, labor, social, fiscal, and patent law and Constitutional Courts deal with more of judicial review and constitutional interpretation. The big thing in Germany constitution is individual liberty, which gives protection to individual liberty in an extensive catalogue of human rights and also divides powers between the federal and state levels which are between the Legislative, Executive, and Judicial branches.

=== Icelandic presidency ===
Iceland's government is a constitutional republic, with three distinct separate branches. The head of the government is the prime minister, who makes up part of the executive branch. The chief of the state is the president, under the executive branch. The president of Iceland is elected to serve four years, however there are no term limits. This vote is conducted by direct popular vote. Iceland has universal suffrage for citizens eighteen and older. The last presidential vote was held in 2024.

In order to run for office of the president a person must be at least thirty-five years old and meet the requirements to be elected into the Althingi, the country's parliament. However the president cannot hold a seat in the Althingi. The president's term in office begins on the first of August. According to the twelfth article of Iceland's Constitution, the president must live in or near Reykjavik, the capital of Iceland. When taking office the president must take an oath to uphold the Constitution. The president appoints and empowers Ministers. The president also appoints some public officials. The president can either accept or reject a bill created by Althingi. If the president accepts the bill, it is signed into law. If the bill is rejected it is sent to the people for a vote as soon as possible.

=== Russian presidency ===
Standard of the president of Russia

According to the Constitution of Russia, the country is a federation and semi-presidential republic, wherein the president is the head of state and the prime minister is the head of government. The President of the Russian Federation is the head of state, supreme commander-in-chief and holder of the highest office within the Russian Federation. Despite the fact that the Constitution of Russia does not explicitly determine the president as the head of the executive branch, executive power is de facto split between the president and the prime minister, who is the head of government.

=== Switzerland presidency ===
The unique aspect of Switzerland's government and politics is that any one citizen can challenge any law voted by federal parliament and any citizen can introduce a new amendment to the federal constitution, which makes Switzerland the closest example of a direct democracy in the world today. In definition, a direct democracy]is the extraordinary amount of participation a citizen can have in the legislation process. The adaption of direct democracy for Switzerland, however, dates all the way back to the 12th century during the Middle Ages.

The president of Switzerland is a current member of Switzerland's executive branch, which is the seven-member Swiss Federal Council. Presidential power in Switzerland is limited, consistent with its commitment to direct democracy. Any Swiss citizen eligible to be a member of the National Council can be elected; candidates do not have to register for the election or to actually be members of the National Council. Unlike most countries, where the presidential term can be up to eight years (two four-year terms), the president of the Swiss Confederation is only appointed one year at a time. The President of the Confederation chairs the meetings of the Federal Council and undertakes special representational duties, while continuing to head their department. The Swiss president is not the Head of State of the country; the Federal Council administers both the Head of State and the Head of Government, which emphasizes that the executive power is not concentrated on only one person. Traditionally the duty of presidency rotates among the members in order of seniority and the previous year's vice president becomes president.

== Vice presidency ==
=== American vice presidency ===
Seal of the vice president of the United States

In the United States, the vice president is the second in command of the country and also presides as the president of the Senate. The vice president may break tie votes in the Senate chamber and also may be assigned additional duties by the president. The vice president is sometimes chosen for election purposes, to help counterbalance the presidential candidate's weakness. For many vice presidents their duties have not been strenuous, but, more recently these duties have increased as more responsibilities are delegated by the president. In the case of the removal of the president from office, or of his death, resignation, or inability to discharge the powers and duties of the said office, the same shall devolve on the vice president. The vice president's salary, as of 2011, is $230,700. The vice president position of the United States is unique in that "it is the only office that participates in two of the three branches of government."

=== Brazilian vice presidency ===
Flag of the vice president of Brazil

The vice president assumes the presidency of the Federative Republic of Brazil in the event that the president can not carry out their duties. The vice president also becomes the "acting president" when the president is away or not available.

=== British Deputy Prime Minister ===
Like many parliamentary systems, the prime minister may appoint a deputy prime minister, who serves many of the duties of a traditional vice president. As the deputy prime minister possesses no de jure powers, they will not automatically assume the duties of the prime minister, in the event of their in-capitation or resignation. The position is often considered one of honor and hence holds many traditional vice presidency powers in a de facto manner.

=== Colombian vice presidency ===
Seal of the vice president of Colombia

The vice president is indirectly elected together with the president to a four-year term of office by the people of Colombia through universal suffrage. Since the passage of the Article 102 Amendment (in 1991) to the Colombian Constitution, the vice president may also be appointed by the president to fill a vacancy, upon leave of absence or death, resignation, or removal of the president.

=== German vice chancellor ===
The vice-chancellor of Germany does not assume the position of chancellor, but rather the president chooses a minister to succeed the chancellor position. The vice-chancellor is usually a member of the cabinet.

== Presidential transition in the United States ==
In the United States, a presidential election is held every four years. While transitions between presidents are peaceful, they are highly complicated and expensive. After the president-elect is sworn in, one of his primary obligations is to build his administration. The most publicized of these duties is appointing members of his Cabinet (Secretary of State, Secretary of Treasury, Secretary of Defense, etc.). In total, the president makes 6,000 to 9,000 appointments, although he has the right to appoint as many as 700,000 to the federal bureaucracy. Sometimes, a president will allow appointments from the previous administration to maintain their position. "Normally these appointments include: Cabinet Officers and heads of other executive branch agencies; Under Secretaries; Assistant Secretaries; Directors of Bureaus and Services; and Chairpersons and Members of Boards, Commissions, and Committees. These appointments are often authorized by specific provisions of law or approved by the Senate."

Until 1963, the president-elect paid for his own smooth transition. In 1963, Congress passed the Presidential Transition Act, which allocates up to $900,000.

There are three different types of positions that the president can delegate.

- PA - Presidential appoint officials unilaterally.
- PAS - President has the ability to appoint officials with the advice and assent of the Senate.
- SES- Non-career Senior Executive Service- are appointed "based on their responsibility for advocating public policy.

confidential character. (Sometimes referred to as 'Schedule C' position)
The average age of a SES is 54 and serves for 23 years.

There are different pay levels for Executive employees, ranging from $114,500 to $157,000. Civilian Payroll for Executive Agencies is nearly 12 million a year. Executive Direct Compensation was $129,923 million and personal benefits were $47,596 million. (As of September 2006)

== Impeachment or removal of a president ==
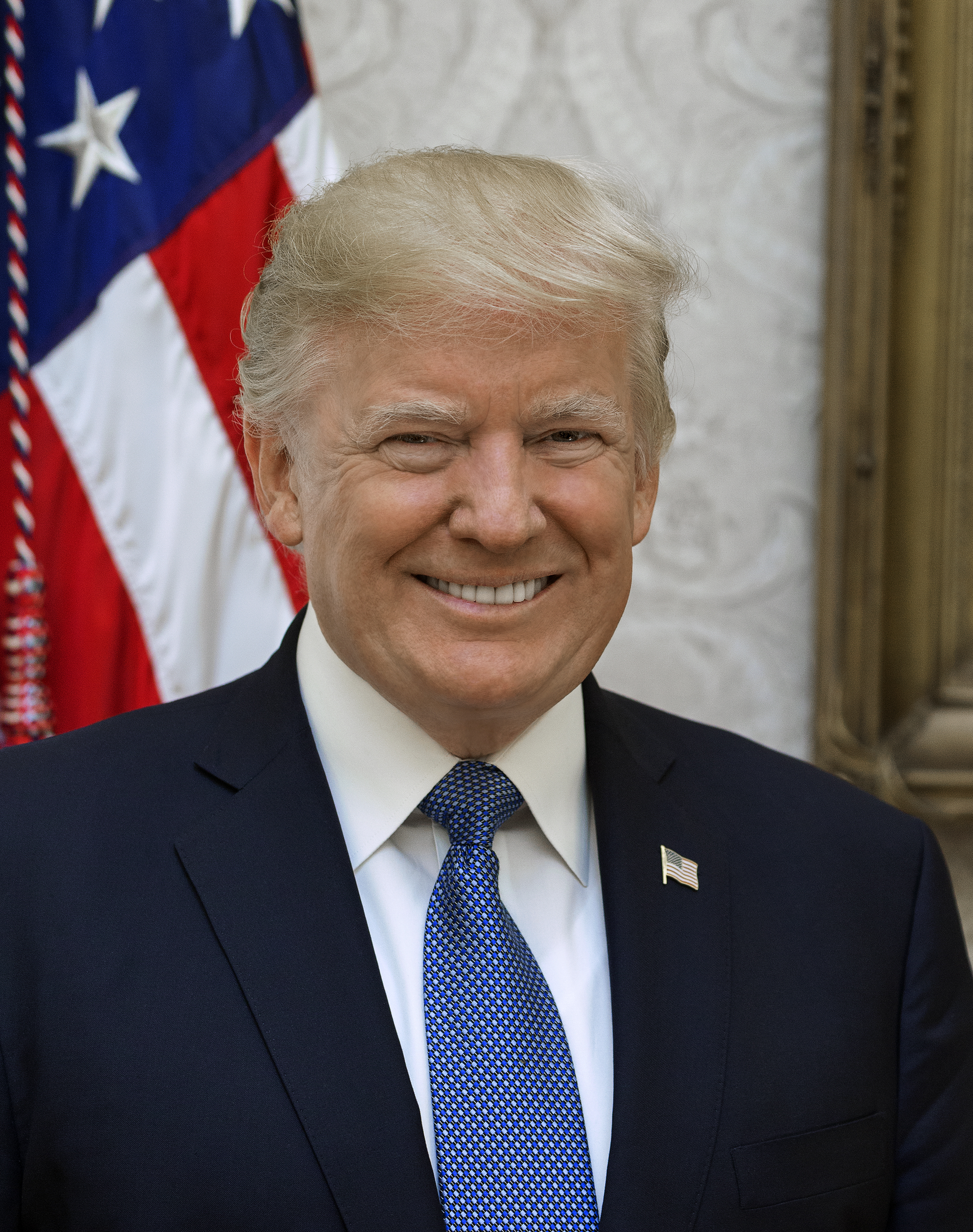
United States president Donald Trump is the first president in U.S. history to be impeached twice.

A president may be removed or impeached from their position in a nation's government for breaking or disregarding various laws or procedures that are written by that nation. The removal or impeachment process varies depending on the nation and their specific form of government. For example, the impeachment process of the president of the United States is quite different from that of France. The president of France is granted what is called the power of immunity throughout their term as the president. This power of immunity states that the president cannot be prosecuted or requested to testify before any jurisdiction. However, they may still be impeached only by the High Court. The High Court is a court conveyed by both houses of Parliament. In the United States, the impeachment process begins in the House of Representatives, where the president is first accused of committing either bribery, treason, or other high crimes including misdemeanors. If the House passes a majority vote to impeach the president, the Senate then conducts the trial to remove them from office. If a president is found guilty, he is removed from office and replaced by the vice president for the remainder of the term. If the president is acquitted in court, he will continue to serve the rest of their term as president.

== Protection of the presidency ==
=== Protection for former Presidents of the United States ===
For former presidents who had entered office before January 1, 1997, are entitled to lifetime protection carried out by The Secret Service. Protection of the president's spouse is also granted until death or in the case of remarriage. In 1984 the ability to decline Secret Service protection was enacted by legislation enacted. The costs of protecting former presidents and dependents are not publicized by the Secret Service due to security reasoning. Former presidents who entered office after January 1, 1997, are limited to ten years of protection for themselves and their spouses. A spouse's protection ends upon divorce, remarriage, or the former president's death.

According to the Twenty-fifth Amendment to the United States Constitution, the death of a president still active in office is automatically entitles his or hers spouse to one year of protective services. However, authorization of protection can be issued by the Secretary of Homeland Security. Children of former presidents, up to the age of 16, are guaranteed the same services as long as the time period does not surpass 10 years. In addition to direct protection, the Secret Service was entitled to investigate any potential threats against the former presidents and their dependents by the Presidential Threat Protection Act passed in 2000. The act passed by the 106th Congress can be deciphered as so: To amend section 879 of title 18, United States Code, to provide clearer coverage over threats against former presidents and members of their families, and for other purposes.

== Presidential line of succession ==
=== United States ===
The original Constitution of the United States only provided for the vice president to succeed the president in the event that the president becomes incapacitated. In the case that both the president and vice president are incapacitated, Congress will appoint an acting president. In 1791, the founders of the United States provided for only the vice president to usurp the president and was in effect until 1885. In 1947, this changed with the passing of the Presidential Succession Act, which allows for the speaker of the House, the president pro tempore, and the cabinet to succeed the president. Before the passage of the Presidential Succession Act, succession was set up to keep the Executive branch of the presidency separate from the Legislative branch.

The first Presidential Succession Act (valid 1886–1947):

1. Vice President
2. Secretary of State
3. Secretary of Treasury
4. Secretary of War

Presidential line as of 1947:

1. Vice President
2. Speaker of the House of Representatives
3. President Pro Tempore of the Senate
4. Members of Cabinet

=== Brazil ===
1. Vice-President of Brazil
2. President of the Chamber of Deputies of Brazil
3. President of the Senate of Brazil
4. President of the Supreme Federal Court

In the event that the president and vice president become incapacitated, the line of succession falls sequentially to the president of the Chamber of Deputies, the president of the Senate, and the president of the Federal Supreme Court (Supremo Tribunal Federal—STF). If less than half of the mandate has been completed, a supplementary election must be called within ninety days. If more than half the mandate has been completed, the Congress elects a new president and vice president within thirty days.

=== Colombia ===
1. Vice President of Colombia
2. Cabinet Members

The Constitution of Colombia establishes that the Vice President is the first person in the presidential line of succession. In the absence of both the president and the vice president, article 203 of the Colombian Constitution establishes that the presidential office will be assumed by a Cabinet Member, in the order of precedence. that establishes the law. The assuming minister must be a member of the same party or movement to which the original president belonged, who will exercise the presidency within thirty days following the presidential vacancy, until Congress elects a new vice president who will assume the presidency.

=== France ===
1. President of the Republic (head of the state)/ Prime Minister (head of the government)
2. President of the Senate (France)
3. Ministry of Foreign and European Affairs (France) (Cabinet member)
4. Minister of Defense (France) (Cabinet member)
5. Ministry of Ecology, Sustainable Development, Transport and Housing (Cabinet member)
6. Minister of Justice (France) (Cabinet member)

The French Cabinet is referred to as the Council of Ministers or Executive Council. President of the Senate acts as president when the president cannot carry out his duties.

=== Italy ===
1. President of the Italian Republic (head of state)
2. Prime Minister of Italy (President of the Council of Ministers) -Appointed by the President
3. Cabinet members

=== Australia ===
1. Prime Minister of Australia
2. Deputy Prime Minister (Always a member of the Cabinet)

=== Japan ===
1. Prime Minister of Japan
2. Deputy Prime Minister of Japan

=== Germany ===
1. Chancellor of Germany
2. Vice Chancellor of Germany

The deputy chancellor acts as chancellor until Parliament can elect a new chancellor.

=== Austria ===
1. Chancellor of Austria
2. Vice Chancellor of Austria

== Presidential, vice presidential, and legislative compensation ==
=== United States ===
- Compensation of U.S. President

The United States presidential salary cap is $400,000 per year. The current salary cap was set in 2001, designed to account for cost-of-living increases. George W. Bush was the first U.S. president to receive this amount. Previous to 2001, the salary cap was set at $200,000 per year. In addition to the base salary, in 1949, the president began receiving a $50,000 expense account. Details and rules for the compensation of the U.S. presidency can be found in the United States Constitution under Article II, Section I and in the U.S. Code under Title III, Chapter II.

- Additional Expense Accounts

In addition to the $50,000 expense account for the president implemented in 1949, the president also receives numerous other expense reimbursements. These funds are set aside to cover expenses including official expenses of the White House office, entertainment expenses and traveling expenses for anyone who travels with the president. Also, there is an “Unanticipated Needs” account awarded. This account is not to exceed over $1 million per year and acts as a backup for an instance in which the president exceeds budgeting in other accounts.

- Retirement for the presidency

The president receives an annual pension of at least $150,000 after leaving office. The pension is to be equal to that of a current cabinet member. Additional perks are given to the former presidents, including free postal service and up to $96,000 for office space. Also, after their term has expired, former presidents are allotted $150,000 per year to help with the transition from presidency to civilian life for the first 30 months after leaving office.

- Vice president- $230,700

Receives similar protection benefits to the president
Does not automatically receives a pension as vice president. As President of the Senate, vice president receives pension as a member of Congress.

- Senator- $174,000

A Leadership member's salary is higher.
Average Pension- $35,952---$60,972

- House of Representatives member- $174,000

A Leadership member's salary is higher.

=== Brazil ===
- President of Brazil- $320,678 (R$347.400,69)

"Permanent security protection (by the Presidential Guard – Batalhão da Guarda Presidencial)
The use of two official vehicles (for life)
Repository funding for a presidential library
Lifelong monthly pension for widows and unmarried daughters of ex-presidents;
Pension for sons of ex-presidents until they come of age, should a president or former president die leaving an underage son."

=== France ===
- President of France €178,923.72 (€14,910.31/month)

=== Singapore ===
- President of Singapore - S$1.54 million
- Prime Minister of Singapore - S$2.2 million

=== United Kingdom ===
- Prime Minister of the United Kingdom- $309,394.64
- Deputy Prime Minister of the United Kingdom - $209,504.25 (£134,565)
- Parliamentary Members - $101,826.24 (£65,738

Parliamentary Members receive allowances for, traveling expenses, stationery and postage

=== Italy ===
Prime Minister of Italy- $220,924.70

=== Australia ===
- Prime Minister of Australia- $354,671
- Deputy Prime Minister of Australia- $279,644

When acting Prime Minister, the Deputy Prime Minister is paid the same rate of salary per annum payable to the Prime Minister.

- Cabinet Minister- $235,310
- Member of Parliament- $136,412

=== Japan ===
- Prime Minister of Japan - $343,000
- House of Representatives and House of Councilors - $211,000

Japan has the world highest paid legislators.

=== Germany ===
- Chancellor of Germany (Prime Minister) - $381,198.40

== See also ==
- Campbell v. Clinton
- First Presidency
- Imperial presidency
- Presidencies of British India
- Presidency of Bosnia and Herzegovina
- Presidency of the Council of the European Union
- Swiss Federal Council - a collective head of state
- War Powers Resolution
