= Abbott Laboratories v. Gardner =

- Supreme Court of the United States

Argued January 16, 1967 Decided May 22, 1967
- Full case name: Abbott Laboratories, et al. v. Gardner, Secretary of Health, Education, and Welfare, et al.
- Citations: 387 U.S. 136 (more) 87 S. Ct. 1507; 18 L. Ed. 2d 681; 1967 U.S. LEXIS 2974

Holding
- Drug companies were not prohibited by the ripeness doctrine from challenging an FDA regulation requiring a prescription drug's generic name to appear on all related printed materials.

Court membership
- Chief Justice Earl Warren Associate Justices Hugo Black · William O. Douglas; Tom C. Clark · John M. Harlan II; William J. Brennan Jr. · Potter Stewart; Byron White · Abe Fortas

Case opinions
- Majority: Harlan, joined by Black, Douglas, Stewart, White
- Dissent: Fortas, joined by Warren, Clark
- Dissent: Clark
- Brennan took no part in the consideration or decision of the case.

Laws applied
- Administrative Procedure Act

Abbott Laboratories v. Gardner, 387 U.S. 136 (1967), was a case heard before the United States Supreme Court. The Court held that drug companies were not prohibited by the ripeness doctrine from challenging a U.S. Food and Drug Administration (FDA) regulation requiring a prescription drug's generic name to appear on all related printed materials. The government argued that the case was not ripe because the regulation had yet to be enforced. That argument failed as the Court found the issues to be fit for judicial resolution, and that the drug companies would experience substantial hardship if denied a pre-enforcement challenge to the statute. Prosecution for non-compliance was likely, civil and criminal penalties could be imposed, and the drug companies would suffer reputational damage if required to violate the regulation before challenging it in court.

== Facts ==
The underlying conflict in this case arose from the decision by the Commissioner of Food and Drug to promulgate the "established name" rule pursuant to a statute granted by Congress. After inviting and considering comments submitted by interested parties, the Commissioner established the following rule:

If the label or labeling of a prescription drug bears a proprietary name or designation for the drug or any ingredient thereof, the established name, if such there be, corresponding, to such proprietary name or designation, shall accompany each appearance of such proprietary name or designation.

== Procedural history ==
The action was brought by both the Pharmaceutical Manufacturers Association and thirty-seven member drug manufacturers, accounting for more than 90% of the prescription drug industry. They argued that the Commissioner did not have the statutory authority to promulgate such a rule that required each manufacturer display a drug's established name alongside its trade name. The District Court granted these plaintiffs' motion for summary judgment, finding that the statute did not permit the Commissioner's decision, but the Court of Appeals for the Third Circuit then reversed. In its opinion, the Court of Appeals found that the District Court no jurisdiction to conduct pre-enforcement review (i.e., review prior to the regulation being enforced against a party) of the regulations due to a lack of authorization. Additionally, the court held that it was unable to grant any relief under either the Administrative Procedure Act or the Declaratory Judgment Act due to a lack of an actual case or controversy. The Supreme Court then granted certiorari.

== Holding ==
On May 22, 1967, the Supreme Court reversed and remanded the Third Circuit's decision, finding that, among other things, this particular controversy was ripe for review. Writing for the majority of the Court, Justice Harlan clarified that the two purposes of the ripeness doctrine were to prevent courts from "entangling themselves in abstract disagreements over administrative policies" and also to protect agencies from a court's interference their decisions are final. To satisfy the doctrine, he wrote that the Court will evaluate the "fitness of the issues for judicial decision" followed by the "hardship to the parties of withholding court consideration." With respect to the Commissioner's decision, the Court found that it was fit for review because it dealt with a purely legal issue. Additionally, the Court found that the regulation had an immediate impact on the drug manufacturers since they essentially provide "an authoritative interpretation of a statutory provision that has a direct effect on the day-to-day business of all prescription drug companies."

Justice Fortas dissented and was joined by both Justice Clark and Chief Justice Warren. Justice Brennan did not take part in considering this case.

== Impact on judicial review ==
Due to the Supreme Court's discussion on ripeness in this case, Abbott Laboratories is still a prominent case dealing with the ripeness doctrine. Notably, Abbott Laboratories was also decided on the same day as Toilet Goods Ass'n, Inc. v. Gardner, 387 U.S. 158 (1967), which was also decided on ripeness grounds and also acts as a practical comparison to Abbott Laboratories in its holding. Based on the decisions in both of these cases, the Supreme Court set a new standard pattern for parties to receive this type of pre-enforcement relief. Today, the test developed in Abbott Laboratories helps courts in deciding whether Congress has precluded judicial review over agency action.
