= See v. City of Seattle =

- Supreme Court of the United States

Argued February 15, 1967 Decided June 5, 1967
- Full case name: Norman See v. City of Seattle
- Citations: 387 U.S. 541 (more)

Court membership
- Chief Justice Earl Warren Associate Justices Hugo Black · William O. Douglas; Tom C. Clark · John M. Harlan II; William J. Brennan Jr. · Potter Stewart; Byron White · Abe Fortas

Case opinions
- Majority: White, joined by Warren, Black, Douglas, Brennan, Fortas
- Dissent: Clark, joined by Harlan, Stewart

Laws applied
- U.S. Const. amend. IV
- This case overturned a previous ruling or rulings
- Frank v. Maryland (1959)

See v. City of Seattle, 387 U.S. 523 (1967), is a United States Supreme Court case that overruled a previous case (Frank v. Maryland, 1959) and established the ability of a commercial entity to deny entry to a fire inspector without a warrant or probable cause. It is a companion case to Camara v. Municipal Court of City and County of San Francisco.
