= War Powers Clause =

U.S. Constitutional clause granting Congress the sole authority to declare war

Article I, Section 8, Clause 11 of the U.S. Constitution, sometimes referred to as the War Powers Clause, vests in the Congress the power to declare war, in the following wording:

[The Congress shall have Power ...] To declare War, grant Letters of Marque and Reprisal, and make Rules concerning Captures on Land and Water ...

The Constitution does not specify the form of such a declaration. But, according to the U.S. Senate, eleven wars have been declared by Congress under their constitutional power to do so, beginning with the declaration of war against Great Britain in the War of 1812. Its last declaration of war was in 1942, World War II.

== History and usage ==
In a message to Congress on May 11, 1846, President James K. Polk announced that the Republic of Texas was about to become a state. After Mexico threatened to invade Texas, Polk amassed federal troops around Corpus Christi. When Texas became a state, federal troops moved into an area in which the new international boundary was disputed. Mexican troops moved into the same area, and both forces clashed. The President then said that "after reiterated menaces, Mexico has passed the boundary of the United States, has invaded our territory and shed American blood upon the American soil. She has proclaimed that hostilities have commenced and that the two nations are now at war." Some in Congress wondered if that was actually so, including Abraham Lincoln, who wrote in a letter to his law partner:

Let me first state what I understand to be your position- It is, that if it shall become necessary, to repel invasion, the President may, without violation of the constitution, cross the line, and invade the territory of another country; and that whether such necessity exists in any given case, the President is to be the sole judge. ... Allow the President to invade a neighboring nation, whenever he shall deem it necessary to repel an invasion, and you allow him to do so, whenever he may choose to say he deems it necessary for such purpose—and allow him to make war at pleasure. Study to see if you can fix any limit to his power in this respect, after you have given him so much as you propose. If, today, he should choose to say he thinks it necessary to invade Canada, to prevent the British from invading us, how could you stop him? You may say to him, "I see no probability of the British invading us" but he will say to you "be silent; I see it, if you don't."

The provision of the Constitution giving the war-making power to Congress, was dictated, as I understand it, by the following reasons--Kings had always been involving and impoverishing their people in wars, pretending generally, if not always, that the good of the people was the object. This, our convention understood to be the most oppressive of all Kingly oppressions; and they resolved to so frame the Constitution that no one man should hold the power of bringing this oppression upon us. But your view destroys the whole matter, and places our President where kings have always stood.

Representative Lincoln moved for a resolution issuing the President interrogatories (questions) so that Congress could determine for itself the exact "spot" of the conflict and whether the Congress believed it to be in the United States. However, Congress, by roll-call vote, declared war.

If it was true that the war was ongoing because the President had to repel a sudden attack, that had been contemplated by the framers in Philadelphia in August 1787, when the wording of the proposed Constitution was changed from "make war" to "declare war". American presidents have often not sought formal declarations of war but instead maintained that they have constitutional authority (Article II, Section 2) as commander-in chief-to use the military for "police actions".

The Korean War was the first modern example of the U.S. being taken to war without a formal declaration by Congress, as has been repeated in every armed conflict since. Beginning with the Vietnam War, however, Congress has given other various forms of authorization to do so. Some debate continues as to their appropriateness as well as the tendency of the executive branch to engage in the origination of such a push, its marketing, and even propagandizing or related activities to generate such support.

In light of the speculation concerning the Gulf of Tonkin Incident and the possible abuse of the authorization that followed, Congress in 1973 passed the War Powers Resolution, which requires the President to obtain either a declaration of war or a resolution authorizing the use of force from Congress within 60 days of initiating hostilities with a full disclosure of facts in the process. Its constitutionality has never been settled, and some, including Presidents, have criticized it as an unconstitutional encroachment upon the President. In 2007, University of Virginia Professor Larry J. Sabato proposed, in his book A More Perfect Constitution, a constitutional amendment that would settle the issue by spelling out the exact powers of each branch in the Constitution itself. One counterargument is that the Constitution is a "living document" that has survived for over 200 years because not everything is "spelled out." In the area of the War Powers Clause, the flexibility provided by the requirement for a congressional statute for a declaration of war and constitutional interpretation could be sufficient. The President could defend the country himself but not use the military offensively without Congress. That would not require a constitutional amendment or a statute like the War Powers Resolution since it has been used since 1787.

Some legal scholars maintain that offensive, non-police military actions, while a quorum can still be convened (see Continuity of government), taken without a formal congressional declaration of war is unconstitutional since no amendment has changed the original intent to make the War Powers Resolution legally binding. However, the US Supreme Court has never ruled directly on the matter and no counterresolutions has come to a vote. In the absence of a determination by the Supreme Court, the principle of separation of powers produces a stalemate on the issue.

== Constitutional convention debate ==
Pierce Butler of South Carolina was the only delegate to the Philadelphia Convention who suggested giving the executive the power to take offensive military action. He suggested that even if the President should be able to do so, he, in practice, would have the character not to do so without mass support. Elbridge Gerry, a delegate from Massachusetts, summed up the majority viewpoint saying he "never expected to hear in a republic a motion to empower the Executive alone to declare war." George Mason, Thomas Jefferson, and other contemporaries voiced similar sentiments.

== War Powers Reform ==
Congress has at various points sought to reassert its constitutional responsibility over war powers decisions, including since its enactment of the War Powers Resolution in 1973. In 2021, the House Rules Committee and the House Foreign Affairs Committee held hearings on war powers reform, at which testified several war powers scholars and former government officials.

== Supreme Court cases ==
- Woods v. Cloyd W. Miller Co. (1948)
- Youngstown Sheet & Tube Co. v. Sawyer (1952)
- Torres v. Texas Department of Public Safety (2021)

== Other cases ==
- Dellums v. Bush (D.C. Dist. 1990)
- Campbell v. Clinton (D.C. Dist. 2000)

== See also ==
- Commander-in-Chief
- The Imperial Presidency
- Unitary executive theory
- War Powers Resolution (War Powers Act of 1973)
