= Dellums =

Dellums is a surname. Notable people with the surname include:

- C. L. Dellums (1900–1989), American labor activist
- Erik Dellums (born 1964), American actor
- Piper Dellums, American author and public speaker
- Ron Dellums (1935–2018), American politician

== See also ==
- Ronald V. Dellums Federal Building, federal building complex in Oakland, California
- Dellums v. Bush, a D.C. Federal District Court decision by United States District Judge Harold H. Greene
