= Authorization for Use of Military Force Against Iraq Resolution of 2002 =

Joint resolution of the US Congress

- Long title: Joint Resolution to authorise the use of United States Armed Forces against Iraq
- Nicknames: Iraq Resolution
- Enacted by: the 107th United States Congress
- Effective: October 16, 2002

Citations
- Public law: Pub. L. 107–243 (text) (PDF)
- Statutes at Large: 116 Stat. 1498

Legislative history
- Introduced in the House by Dennis Hastert (R–IL) on October 2, 2002; Committee consideration by House International Relations Committee; Passed the House on October 10, 2002 (296–133); Passed the Senate on October 11, 2002 (77–23); Signed into law by President George W. Bush on October 16, 2002

Major amendments
- Repealed by the National Defense Authorization Act for Fiscal Year 2026

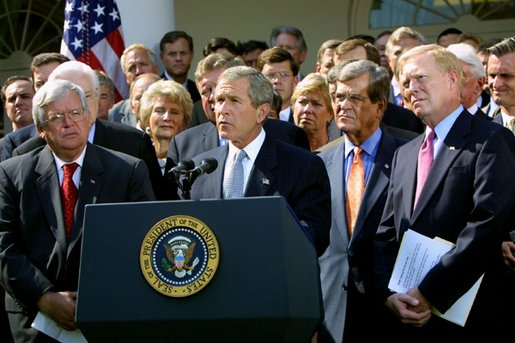
President George W. Bush, surrounded by leaders of the House and Senate, announces the Joint Resolution to Authorize the Use of United States Armed Forces Against Iraq, October 2, 2002.

The Authorization for Use of Military Force Against Iraq Resolution of 2002, informally known as the Iraq Resolution, was a joint resolution passed by the United States Congress in October 2002 as Public Law No. 107-243, authorizing the use of the United States Armed Forces against Saddam Hussein's Ba'athist Iraqi government in what would be known as Operation Iraqi Freedom. It was repealed by the National Defense Authorization Act for Fiscal Year 2026.

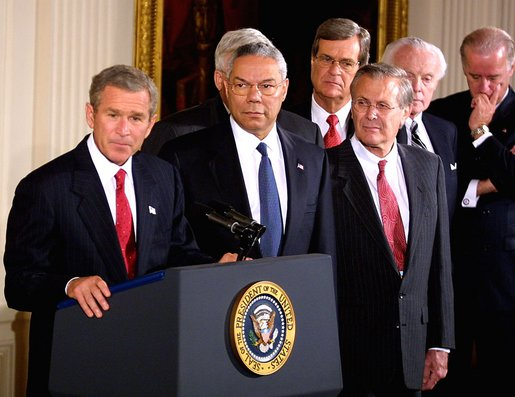
George W. Bush signs the Resolution, with Colin Powell and Donald Rumsfeld at his side, on October 16, 2002. In the background, on the far right, is then-senator and future president Joe Biden, who voted in favor of the Resolution.

== Contents ==
The resolution cited many factors as justifying the use of military force against Iraq:

- Iraq's noncompliance with the conditions of the 1991 ceasefire agreement, including interference with U.N. weapons inspectors.
- Iraq "continuing to possess and develop a significant chemical and biological weapons capability" and "actively seeking a nuclear weapons capability" posed a "threat to the national security of the United States and international peace and security in the Persian Gulf region."
- Iraq's "brutal repression of its civilian population."
- Iraq's "capability and willingness to use weapons of mass destruction against other nations and its own people".
- Iraq's hostility towards the United States as demonstrated by the 1993 assassination attempt on former president George H. W. Bush and firing on coalition aircraft enforcing the no-fly zones following the 1991 Gulf War.
- Members of al-Qaeda, an organization bearing responsibility for attacks on the United States, its citizens, and interests, including the attacks that occurred on September 11, 2001, are known to be in Iraq.
- Iraq's "continu[ing] to aid and harbor other international terrorist organizations," including anti-United States terrorist organizations.
- Iraq paid bounty to families of suicide bombers.
- The efforts by the Congress and the President to fight terrorists, and those who aided or harbored them.
- The authorization by the Constitution and the Congress for the President to fight anti-United States terrorism.
- The governments in Israel, Turkey, Kuwait, and Saudi Arabia feared Saddam and wanted him removed from power.
- Citing the Iraq Liberation Act of 1998, the resolution reiterated that it should be the policy of the United States to remove the Saddam Hussein regime and promote a democratic replacement.

The resolution "supported" and "encouraged" diplomatic efforts by President George W. Bush to "strictly enforce through the U.N. Security Council all relevant Security Council resolutions regarding Iraq" and "obtain prompt and decisive action by the Security Council to ensure that Iraq abandons its strategy of delay, evasion, and noncompliance and promptly and strictly complies with all relevant Security Council resolutions regarding Iraq."

The resolution authorized President Bush to use the Armed Forces of the United States "as he determines to be necessary and appropriate" in order to "defend the national security of the United States against the continuing threat posed by Iraq; and enforce all relevant United Nations Security Council Resolutions regarding Iraq."

== Passage ==
An authorization by Congress was sought by President George W. Bush soon after his September 12, 2002 statement before the U.N. General Assembly asking for quick action by the Security Council in enforcing the resolutions against Iraq.

Of the legislation introduced by Congress in response to President Bush's requests, S.J.Res. 45 sponsored by Sen. Daschle and Sen. Lott was based on the original White House proposal authorizing the use of force in Iraq, H.J.Res. 114 sponsored by Rep. Hastert and Rep. Gephardt and the substantially similar S.J.Res. 46 sponsored by Sen. Lieberman were modified proposals. H.J.Res. 110 sponsored by Rep. Hastings was a separate proposal never considered on the floor. Eventually, the Hastert–Gephardt proposal became the legislation Congress focused on.

=== Passage of the full resolution ===
Introduced in Congress on October 2, 2002, in conjunction with the administration's proposals, H.J.Res. 114 passed the House of Representatives on Thursday afternoon at 3:05 p.m. EDT on October 10, 2002, by a vote of 296–133, and passed the Senate after midnight early Friday morning, at 12:50 a.m. EDT on October 11, 2002, by a vote of 77–23. It was signed into law as Pub. L. 107–243 (text) (PDF) by President Bush on October 16, 2002.

==== United States House of Representatives ====
Party	Yeas	Nays	Not Voting
Republican	215	6	2
Democratic	81	126	1
Independent	0	1	0
TOTALS	296	133	3

- 215 (96.4%) of 223 Republican representatives voted for the resolution.
- 81 (39.2%) of 208 Democratic representatives voted for the resolution.
- 6 (<2.7%) of 223 Republican representatives voted against the resolution: Reps. Duncan (R-TN), Hostettler (R-IN), Houghton (R-NY), Leach (R-IA), Morella (R-MD), Paul (R-TX).
- 126 (~60.3%) of 209 Democratic representatives voted against the resolution.
- The only Independent representative voted against the resolution: Rep. Sanders (I-VT)
  - Reps. Ortiz (D-TX), Roukema (R-NJ), and Stump (R-AZ) did not vote on the resolution.

==== United States Senate ====
Party	Yeas	Nays
Republican	48	1
Democratic	29	21
Independent	0	1
TOTALS	77	23

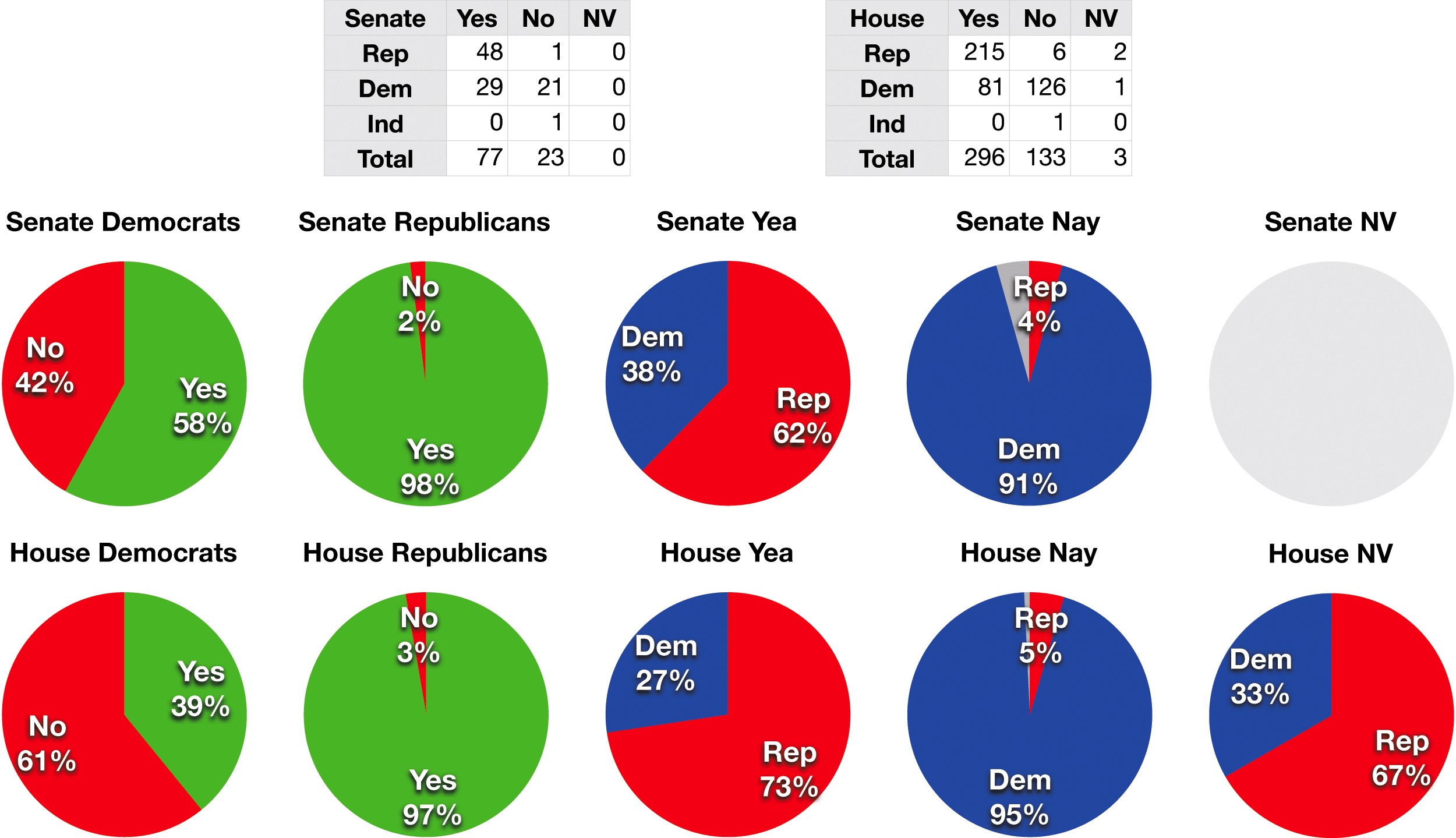
Final Congressional vote by chamber and party, October 2002

- 29 (58%) of 50 Democratic senators voted for the resolution. Those voting for the resolution were:

Sens. Baucus (D-MT), Bayh (D-IN), Biden (D-DE), Breaux (D-LA), Cantwell (D-WA), Carnahan (D-MO), Carper (D-DE), Cleland (D-GA), Clinton (D-NY), Daschle (D-SD), Dodd (D-CT), Dorgan (D-ND), Edwards (D-NC), Feinstein (D-CA), Harkin (D-IA), Hollings (D-SC), Johnson (D-SD), Kerry (D-MA), Kohl (D-WI), Landrieu (D-LA), Lieberman (D-CT), Lincoln (D-AR), Miller (D-GA), Nelson (D-FL), Nelson (D-NE), Reid (D-NV), Rockefeller (D-WV), Schumer (D-NY), and Torricelli (D-NJ).

- 21 (42%) of 50 Democratic senators voted against the resolution. Those voting against the resolution were:

Sens. Akaka (D-HI), Bingaman (D-NM), Boxer (D-CA), Byrd (D-WV), Conrad (D-ND), Corzine (D-NJ), Dayton (D-MN), Durbin (D-IL), Feingold (D-WI), Graham (D-FL), Inouye (D-HI), Kennedy (D-MA), Leahy (D-VT), Levin (D-MI), Mikulski (D-MD), Murray (D-WA), Reed (D-RI), Sarbanes (D-MD), Stabenow (D-MI), Wellstone (D-MN), and Wyden (D-OR).

- 1 (2%) of 49 Republican senators voted against the resolution: Sen. Chafee (R-RI).
- The only independent senator voted against the resolution: Sen. Jeffords (I-VT)

=== Amendments offered to the House Resolution ===
==== Lee Amendment ====
Amendment in the nature of a substitute sought to have the United States work through the United Nations to seek to resolve the matter of ensuring that Iraq is not developing weapons of mass destruction, through mechanisms such as the resumption of weapons inspections, negotiation, enquiry, mediation, regional arrangements, and other peaceful means.

Sponsored by Rep. Barbara Lee (D-CA).

Failed by the Ayes and Nays: 72 – 355

==== Spratt Amendment ====
Amendment in the nature of a substitute sought to authorize the use of U.S. armed forces to support any new U.N. Security Council resolution that mandated the elimination, by force if necessary, of all Iraqi weapons of mass destruction, long-range ballistic missiles, and the means of producing such weapons and missiles. Requested that the president should seek authorization from Congress to use the armed forces of the U.S. in the absence of a U.N. Security Council resolution sufficient to eliminate, by force if necessary, all Iraqi weapons of mass destruction, long-range ballistic missiles, and the means of producing such weapons and missiles. Provided expedited consideration for authorization in the latter case.

Sponsored by Rep. John Spratt (D-SC-5).

Failed by the Yeas and Nays: 155 – 270

==== House Rules Amendment ====
An amendment considered as adopted pursuant to the provisions of H.Res. 574

Sponsored by House Rules.

Resolution (H.RES.574) agreed to by voice vote

=== Amendments offered to the Senate Resolution ===
==== Byrd Amendments ====
To provide statutory construction that constitutional authorities remain unaffected and that no additional grant of authority is made to the president not directly related to the existing threat posed by Iraq.

Sponsored by Sen. Robert Byrd (D-WV).

Amendment SA 4868 not agreed to by Yea-Nay Vote: 14 – 86

To provide a termination date for the authorization of the use of the Armed Forces of the United States, together with procedures for the extension of such date unless Congress disapproves the extension.

Sponsored by Sen. Robert Byrd (D-WV).

Amendment SA 4869 not agreed to by Yea-Nay Vote: 31 – 66

==== Levin Amendment ====
To authorize the use of the United States Armed Forces, pursuant to a new resolution of the United Nations Security Council, to destroy, remove, or render harmless Iraq's weapons of mass destruction, nuclear weapons-usable material, long-range ballistic missiles, and related facilities, and for other purposes.

Sponsored by Sen. Carl Levin (D-MI).

Amendment SA 4862 not agreed to by Yea-Nay Vote: 24 – 75

==== Durbin Amendment ====
To amend the authorization for the use of the Armed Forces to cover an imminent threat posed by Iraq's weapons of mass destruction rather than the continuing threat posed by Iraq.

Sponsored by Sen. Dick Durbin (D-IL).

Amendment SA 4865 not agreed to by Yea-Nay Vote: 30 – 70

== Legal challenges ==
=== U.S. law ===
The United States Court of Appeals for the First Circuit refused to review the legality of the invasion in 2003, citing a lack of ripeness.

In early 2003, the Iraq Resolution was challenged in court to stop the invasion from happening. The plaintiffs argued that the president does not have the authority to declare war. The final decision came from a three-judge panel from the US Court of Appeals for the First Circuit which dismissed the case. Judge Lynch wrote in the opinion that the Judiciary cannot intervene unless there is a fully developed conflict between the President and Congress or if Congress gave the President "absolute discretion" to declare war.

Similar efforts to secure judicial review of the invasion's legality have been dismissed on a variety of justiciability grounds.

=== International law ===
United Nations secretary general Kofi Annan stated in 2004 that the invasion was illegal, and that it was "not in conformity with the UN Charter".

==== U.N. security council resolutions ====
Debate about the legality of the 2003 invasion of Iraq under international law, centers around ambiguous language in parts of U.N. Resolution 1441 (2002). The U.N. Charter in Article 39 states: "The Security Council shall determine the existence of any threat to the peace, breach of the peace, or act of aggression and shall make recommendations, or decide what measures shall be taken in accordance with Articles 41 and 42, to maintain or restore international peace and security".

The position of the U.S. and U.K. is that the invasion was authorized by a series of U.N. resolutions dating back to 1990 and that since the U.N. security council has made no Article 39 finding of illegality, that no illegality exists.

Resolution 1441 declared that Iraq was in "material breach" of the cease-fire under U.N. Resolution 687 (1991), which required cooperation with weapons inspectors. The Vienna Convention on the Law of Treaties states that under certain conditions, a party may invoke a "material breach" to suspend a multilateral treaty. Thus, the U.S. and U.K. claim that they used their right to suspend the cease-fire in Resolution 687 and to continue hostilities against Iraq under the authority of U.N. Resolution 678 (1990), which originally authorized the use of force after Iraq invaded Kuwait. This is the same argument that was used for Operation Desert Fox in 1998. They also contend that, while Resolution 1441 required the UNSC to assemble and assess reports from the weapons inspectors, it was not necessary for the UNSC to reach an agreement on the course of action. If, at that time, it was determined that Iraq breached Resolution 1441, the resolution did not "constrain any member state from acting to defend itself against the threat posed by Iraq". The United States government argued, wholly apart from Resolution 1441, that it has a right of pre-emptive self-defense to protect itself from terrorism fomented by Iraq.

It remains unclear whether any party other than the Security Council can make the determination that Iraq breached Resolution 1441, as U.N. members commented that it is not up to one member state to interpret and enforce U.N. resolutions for the entire council. In addition, other nations have stated that a second resolution was required to initiate hostilities.

== Repeal ==
On June 17, 2021, the House of Representatives voted for House Resolution 256, to repeal the 2002 resolution by a vote of 268–161. 219 House Democrats and 49 House Republicans voted to repeal, while 160 Republicans and 1 Democrat voted to oppose the repeal.

In July 2021, three senators, Christopher Murphy, Mike Lee & Bernie Sanders, introduced S.2391, the National Security Powers Act of 2021, which would have repealed previous war authorizations and established new procedures, but a Senator put a quasi-anonymous hold on it in committee until it was dead. Its companion in the House, H.R.5410, the National Security Reforms and Accountability Act, did not contain the repeal language (which prevented the Senators' attempt to repeal), and again, this companion bill was quasi-anonymously held in committee til it was dead.

On March 16, 2023, a bill (S. 316) to repeal the 1991 and 2002 AUMFs, introduced by senators Tim Kaine and Todd Young, was advanced by the Senate by 68 votes to 27, but its companion, H.R.932, has been quasi-anonymously held by a Representative in the House Committee on Foreign Affairs since February 9, 2023.

On July 13, 2023, in a further attempt to repeal the 1991 and 2002 AUMFs, Tim Kaine & Todd Young introduced S.Amdt.427 to S.2226, the National Defense Authorization Act for Fiscal Year 2024. But they didn't timely propose it on the floor so that when the bill passed the Senate, no action was taken on their amendment & it was therefore, by default, excluded by law. Both AUMFs were ultimately repealed when President Donald Trump signed the National Defense Authorization Act for Fiscal Year 2026 on December 18, 2025.

== See also ==
- 2003 invasion of Iraq
- Authorization for Use of Military Force
- British Parliamentary approval for the invasion of Iraq
- Command responsibility
- Gulf of Tonkin Resolution
- Jus ad bellum
- Just war theory
- Iraq War
- Legality of the Iraq War
- Legitimacy of the 2003 invasion of Iraq
- Rationale for the Iraq War
- United Nations
- United Nations Charter
- Views on the 2003 invasion of Iraq
- War of aggression
- War on terror
