= Camara v. Municipal Court of the City and County of San Francisco =

Camara v. Municipal Court
- Supreme Court of the United States

Argued February 15, 1967 Decided June 5, 1967
- Full case name: Roland Camara v. Municipal Court of the City and County of San Francisco
- Citations: 387 U.S. 523 (more) 87 S. Ct. 1727; 18 L. Ed. 2d 930

Case history
- Prior: 237 Cal. App. 2d 128, 46 Cal. Rptr. 585 (Dist. App. 1st Dist. 1965); probable jurisdiction noted, 385 U.S. 808 (1966).

Court membership
- Chief Justice Earl Warren Associate Justices Hugo Black · William O. Douglas; Tom C. Clark · John M. Harlan II; William J. Brennan Jr. · Potter Stewart; Byron White · Abe Fortas

Case opinions
- Majority: White, joined by Warren, Black, Douglas, Brennan, Fortas
- Dissent: Clark, joined by Harlan, Stewart

Laws applied
- U.S. Const. amend. IV
- This case overturned a previous ruling or rulings
- Frank v. Maryland (1959)

Camara v. Municipal Court, 387 U.S. 523 (1967), is a United States Supreme Court case that overruled a previous case (Frank v. Maryland, 1959) and established the ability of a resident to deny entry to a building inspector without a warrant.

== Background ==
In 1963, a housing inspector from San Francisco's health department entered an apartment building to conduct a routine inspection to locate possible code violations. The building manager informed the inspector that a tenant might be using his space contrary to permitted policy. The inspector approached the tenant to enter the area, but the tenant denied entrance for lack of a search warrant. The inspector returned twice more, again without a search warrant, and was again denied entry. A complaint was subsequently filed against the tenant, and he was arrested for violating a city code. He filed suit under the Fourth and Fourteenth Amendments.

The California district court of appeal, relying on the previous case of Frank v. Maryland (1959), upholding a conviction in similar circumstances, ruled against the tenant. The tenant then appealed to the Supreme Court, arguing that the decision in Frank v. Maryland should be overruled.

== Decision ==
Writing for the Court, Justice White wrote that, “having concluded that Frank v. State of Maryland, to the extent that it sanctioned such warrantless inspections, must be overruled, we reverse.” He first reviewed principles of the Fourth Amendment, noting that “the basic purpose of this Amendment...is to safeguard the privacy and security of individuals against arbitrary invasions by governmental officials.” He then reviewed Frank's reasoning, “re-examin[ing] of the factors which persuaded the Frank majority to adopt” its approach. He disagreed with Frank that routine inspections are peripheral and that “it is surely anomalous to say that the individual and his private property are fully protected by the Fourth Amendment only when the individual is suspected of criminal behavior.” He reviewed other aspects of Frank, and found that “administrative searches of the kind at issue here are significant intrusions upon the interest protected by the Fourth Amendment.”

White then discussed “whether some other accommodation between public need and individual rights is essential” when dealing with public health and safety. He noted that routine inspections are necessary to ensure health and safety compliance with public codes, and that such inspections are well within common law history. Therefore, “area inspection is a ‘reasonable’ search of private property within the meaning of the Fourth Amendment.”

Because the inspection is reasonable, when government officials are inspecting premises for health and safety compliance, “it seems likely that warrants should normally be sought only after entry is refused unless there has been a citizen complaint or there is other satisfactory reason for securing immediate entry. Similarly, the requirement of a warrant procedure does not suggest any change in what seems to be the prevailing local policy, in most situations, of authorizing entry, but not entry by force, to inspect.”

However, because the tenant had refused entry, a warrant was necessary, so charging the tenant for refusing entry without a warrant was unconstitutional. The ruling of the lower court was vacated and remanded.

== Dissent ==
In a dissent to two cases (See v. City of Seattle and this case), Justice Clark wrote, “Today, the Court renders this municipal experience [to inspect buildings], which dates back to Colonial days, for naught by overruling Frank v. Maryland and by striking down hundreds of city ordinances throughout the country and jeopardizing thereby the health, welfare, and safety of literally millions of people. But this is not all. It prostitutes the command of the Fourth Amendment...and sets up in the health and safety codes area inspection a newfangled ‘warrant’ system that is entirely foreign to Fourth Amendment standards.”

== See also ==
- List of United States Supreme Court cases, volume 387
- Frank v. Maryland (1959)
- See v. City of Seattle 387 U.S. 541 (1967) the same rule applies to commercial properties.
