= Boutilier v. Immigration and Naturalization Service =

- Supreme Court of the United States

Argued March 14, 1967 Decided May 22, 1967
- Full case name: Clive Michael Boutilier v. Immigration and Naturalization Service
- Citations: 387 U.S. 118 (more) 87 S. Ct. 1563; 18 L. Ed. 2d 661
- Argument: Oral argument

Case history
- Prior: Boutilier v. Immigration and Naturalization Service, 363 F.2d 488 (2d Cir. 1966); cert. granted, 385 U.S. 927 (1966).

Holding
- An alien who was a homosexual at the time of entry into the United States can be excluded from immigration under the Immigration and Nationality Act of 1952.

Court membership
- Chief Justice Earl Warren Associate Justices Hugo Black · William O. Douglas; Tom C. Clark · John M. Harlan II; William J. Brennan Jr. · Potter Stewart; Byron White · Abe Fortas

Case opinions
- Majority: Clark, joined by Warren, Black, Harlan, Stewart, White
- Dissent: Brennan
- Dissent: Douglas, joined by Fortas
- Abrogated by
- Immigration Act of 1990

Boutilier v. Immigration and Naturalization Service, 387 U.S. 118 (1967), was a United States Supreme Court case in which the Court upheld Clive Michael Boutilier's deportation from the United States under the Immigration and Nationality Act of 1952 due to his history of homosexual activities. The Act itself did not specify homosexuality among its exclusion criteria, but the Court held that Congress clearly intended that a homosexual individual be excluded from entry into the United States as one "afflicted with [a] psychopathic personality." The decision was abrogated by the Immigration Act of 1990, which rejected sexual orientation as a basis for excluding an individual from immigration.

== Background ==
=== Immigration Investigation ===
In 1955, at the age of 21, Clive Boutilier emigrated from his native Canada to the United States with his family. In 1963, he attempted to apply for American citizenship, and in his application, he revealed to the Immigration and Naturalization Service (INS) that he had been arrested on a sodomy charge in New York City in 1959. In a subsequent meeting with an INS investigator, Boutilier revealed additional details about his sexual history, which included consensual same-sex activities both before and after he entered the United States.

INS sent documentation about Boutilier's testimony to the Public Health Service (PHS) for review. PHS issued a certificate indicating that Boutilier "was afflicted with a class A condition, namely, psychopathic personality, sexual deviate, at the time of his admission to the United States for permanent residence on June 22nd, 1955." After receiving this certificate, the INS initiated deportation proceedings against Clive Boutilier based on the exclusion criteria laid out in the Immigration and Nationality Act of 1952.

Boutilier declined an opportunity to submit to a personal examination by PHS doctors, but he had instead offered letters from two different psychiatrists that both concluded that he was not a psychopathic personality as was understood by medical professionals. The first psychiatrist that he consulted, Dr. Edward Falsey, concluded that Boutilier had a "psychosexual problem" for which he was now beginning treatment, but that he showed no signs of psychosis and, in his professional opinion, there was no risk that Boutilier would develop psychosis in the future. The second psychiatrist, Dr. Montague Ullman, concluded that his sexuality was "fluid and immature" and that his homosexual tendencies were due to a dependent personality pattern and a need to be accepted rather than a psychopathic personality.

Ultimately, these examinations were of little use to Boutilier's case because immigration officials, as well as officials for the PHS, determined that Congress had intended for homosexuals to be included as part of the term "psychopathic personality." So as it related to issues of immigration, it did not matter what medical professionals considered this term to mean. Furthermore, the examinations by these two psychiatrists supported the conclusion that he was a "sexual deviate of the homosexual type," so the PHS would still be required to issue a certificate certifying that he had a "psychopathic personality."

On August 5, 1965, the INS concluded their investigation into Boutilier and ordered that he be deported from the United States and returned to Canada. On January 12, 1966, his appeal to the Board of Immigration Appeals was dismissed after they concluded that his deportation order was valid.

=== Court of Appeals for the Second Circuit ===
On June 2, 1966, Clive Boutilier's case was argued before the Court of Appeals for the Second Circuit before judges Leonard P. Moore, John Joseph Smith, and Irving Kaufman. Boutlier's argument in this case did not dispute his diagnosis as a homosexual. Rather, it contended that the term "psychopathic personality" cannot be held to include homosexuals. His case relied upon a recent case from the Ninth Circuit, Fleuti v. Rosenberg, 302 F.2d 652 (9th Cir. 1962), where it was held that the term "psychopathic personality" was not precise enough to adequately warn a prospective immigrant that homosexual activity was proscribed, so it was thus void for vagueness. On July 8, 1966, the Appellate Court returned their decision that the deportation order was valid.

The majority opinion, written by Kaufman, upheld the deportation order. In this opinion, Kaufman discussed the legislative history of the Immigration and Nationality Act of 1952 to support the government's claim that Congress had intended to consider homosexuals as excludable. In particular, he noted that some initial bills in Congress had specifically included language to exclude "aliens who are homosexuals or sex perverts" but that the language was eliminated after the PHS advised lawmakers that the "provision for the exclusion of aliens afflicted with psychopathic personality...is sufficiently broad to provide for the exclusion of homosexuals and sex perverts." He also rejected the applicability of Fleuti v. Rosenberg. In this case, the deportation order was primarily based upon Boutilier's behavior prior to entry into the United States, but in Fleuti, the proceedings were mostly focused on post-entry behavior. In his opinion, Kaufman rejected the idea that the void-for-vagueness doctrine applied as the exclusion criterion was not meant to regulate conduct by prospective immigrants, but rather, it was meant to exclude immigrants with certain characteristics. Therefore, it did not matter whether or not it was reasonable for Boutilier to understand that homosexual activities were grounds for denial of entry into the United States. However, he did concede that this doctrine may have been applicable in Fleuti because of that case's reliance on post-entry behavior.

The dissenting opinion, written by Moore, did not contest the idea that Congress intended homosexuality to be considered as a basis for exclusion under the diagnosis of "psychopathic personality." However, Moore did contest the idea that homosexual behavior would always be sufficient to diagnose "psychopathic personality" as it pertained to the law. In particular, he noted the use of the phrase, "frequently include those suffering from sexual deviation" from the PHS's testimony in Congress as evidence that there are situations where the presence of homosexual behavior is not indicative of psychopathic personality and thus not sufficient for exclusion from entry into the United States. From here, he started a discussion about the prevalence of homosexual behavior in society, citing the Kinsey Report assessment that 37% of Americans have had at least one homosexual experience, indicating that homosexual behavior alone would be too broad a criterion for exclusion. He then moved his focus to the void-by-vagueness doctrine that was used in Fleuti and dismissed by the majority. He contended that it was applicable to this case because, based on the examinations performed by the two private psychiatrists, it is reasonable to believe that Boutilier could have changed his behavior prior to immigration were he aware that homosexual behavior could be used to exclude him from immigration to the United States.

== Decision ==
The majority opinion, penned by Tom C. Clark, concluded that Congress had the power to exclude aliens and that Congress intended to include homosexuals in the category of those possessing a "psychopathic personality". The opinion also determined that the statutory language of "psychopathic personality" was not too vague to pass muster under due process review.

A dissent, by William O. Douglas with Abe Fortas concurring, argued that "A label of this kind [psychopathic personality], when freely used, may mean only an unpopular person. It is much too vague by constitutional standards for the imposition of penalties or punishment." According to the dissent, Congress had indeed intended "psychopathic personality" as a medical term, and that medical professionals did not agree that homosexuality was a form of psychopathic personality.

== See also ==
- List of LGBT-related cases in the United States Supreme Court
