= Dellums v. Bush =

- Court: United States District Court for the District of Columbia
- Full case name: Ronald V. Dellums v. George Bush
- Decided: December 13, 1990
- Docket nos.: 90-cv-2866
- Citation: 752 F. Supp. 1141

Court membership
- Judge sitting: Harold H. Greene

Dellums v. Bush, 752 F. Supp. 1141 (D.D.C. 1990), was a D.C. Federal District Court decision by United States District Judge Harold H. Greene, denying the plaintiffs, members of Congress, a preliminary injunction against President George H.W. Bush to stop implementation of his orders directing the United States military to fight in Iraq without first obtaining a declaration of war from Congress, the only branch Constitutionally mandated to declare war.

Fifty four members of Congress, including U.S. Representative Ron Dellums, sued George H.W. Bush in 1990 attempting to halt a preemptive military buildup in the Middle East in response to Iraq's invasion of Kuwait. The plaintiff members of Congress asserted that military action without a declaration of war would be unlawful under U.S. Const. art. I, § 8, cl. 11 of the United States Constitution. The District Court held that, although the plaintiff's claims were plausible, because the President had not yet initiated war-like actions and only 54 members of Congress (53 members of the House and one member of the Senate) were involved in the suit, and not a majority, the dispute was not ripe for adjudication at that time. Accordingly, the motion for preliminary injunction was denied.

Dellums is notable in that it is one of only a few cases in which the Federal Courts have considered whether the War Powers Clause of the U.S. Constitution is justiciable in the courts. The Court in Dellums indicated that, in that instance, it was, but because Congress had not yet acted as a majority, the lawsuit was premature.

The reasoning used in Dellums has not escaped criticism by some authors as an intrusion on executive power.
