= Repeal of the 2002 AUMF =

2023 bill pending in US Congress

To repeal the Authorization for Use of Military Force Against Iraq Resolution of 2002.
- Long title: To repeal the Authorization for Use of Military Force Against Iraq Resolution of 2002.
- Announced in: the 118th United States Congress
- Number of co-sponsors: 70 in the House & 46 in the Senate

Legislative history
- Introduced in the House as H.R.932 by Barbara Lee (D–CA) on February 9, 2023 & in the Senate as S.316 by Tim Kaine (D–VA) and Indiana Senator Todd Young (R–IN) on February 9, 2023; Committee consideration by United States House Committee on Foreign Affairs, United States Senate Committee on Foreign Relations; Passed the Senate on March 29, 2023 (66-30)

H.R.932 (118th), also known as To repeal the authorizations for use of military force (AUMF) against Iraq, is a bill in the 118th United States Congress that would have repealed the 2002 AUMF. H.R.932 was sponsored on February 9, 2023 by Barbara Lee, the lone vote against the 2001 AUMF. H.R.932 was co-sponsored by 70 representatives including 27 Republicans. S.316 (118th), also known as A bill to repeal the authorizations for use of military force against Iraq, is the Senate version of H.R.932 that would have repealed the 2002 AUMF. S.316 was sponsored on February 9, 2023 by Virginia Senator Tim Kaine and Indiana Senator Todd Young. S.316 was co-sponsored by 46 senators including 12 Republicans. S.316 advanced from the Senate by 66 votes to 30 on March 29, 2023. 18 Republican senators voted in favor of Kaine's proposal while no Democratic senators voted against it.

H.R.256 (117th), also known as To repeal the Authorization for Use of Military Force Against Iraq Resolution of 2002, was a bill in the 117th United States Congress that would have repealed the 2002 AUMF. H.R.256 was sponsored on January 11, 2021 by Barbara Lee. H.R.256 was co-sponsored by 134 representatives including 9 Republicans. 49 Republicans voted in favor of Lee's proposal while one Democrat (Elaine Luria) voted against the bill on June 17, 2021. S.J.Res.10 (117th) (S.J.Res.13 (116th) reintroduced), also known as A joint resolution to repeal the authorizations for use of military force against Iraq, and for other purposes, was the Senate version of H.R.256 that would have repealed the 2002 AUMF. S.J.Res.10 was sponsored on March 3, 2021 by Virginia Senator Tim Kaine. S.J.Res.10 was co-sponsored by 51 senators including 11 Republicans. S.J.Res.10 was calendered, but Senator Schumer refused to call it to a vote which resulted in the death of both bills at the end of the 117th Congress on December 30, 2022.

S.Amdt.427 (118th) to S.2226, also known as the National Defense Authorization Act for Fiscal Year 2024, was an amendment to a bill in the 118th United States Congress which was another attempt to repeal the 1991 and 2002 AUMF. S.Amdt.427 was sponsored by Tim Kaine (D–VA) and Indiana Senator Todd Young (R–IN) on July 13, 2023. Neither of its sponsors timely proposed it on the floor, so when S.2226 passed the Senate on July 27, 2023, no action was taken on their amendment. H.R.2670 (118th), also known as the National Defense Authorization Act for Fiscal Year 2024, is the House version of S.2226 that would have repealed the 2002 AUMF. H.R.2670 passed the House on July 14, 2023 and differences with S.2226 are being resolved.

== Tabulated list of attempted repeals ==
As of July 27, 2023:

Congress	Short title	Bill number(s)	Date introduced	Sponsor(s)	# of cosponsors	Latest status
118th Congress	To repeal the authorizations for use of military force against Iraq.	H.R.932	February 9, 2023	Barbara Lee (D-CA)	70	A Rep in the House Committee on Foreign Affairs has placed a hold on it.
118th Congress	A bill to repeal the authorizations for use of military force against Iraq.	S.316	February 9, 2023	Tim Kaine (D-VA) & Todd Young (R–IN)	46	Passed the Senate.
118th Congress	S.Amdt.427 to S.2226, the National Defense Authorization Act for Fiscal Year 2024.	S.Amdt.427	July 13, 2023	Tim Kaine (D-VA) & Todd Young (R–IN)	0	Neither of its sponsors timely proposed it on the floor, so S.Amdt.427 died when S.2226 passed the Senate.
118th Congress	National Defense Authorization Act for Fiscal Year 2024.	H.R.2670	April 18, 2023	Mike Rogers (R-AL)	0	Resolving differences (but S.Amdt.427 is dead, so there's still been no repeal of the 2002 AUMF).
117th Congress	To repeal the Authorization for Use of Military Force Against Iraq Resolution of 2002.	H.R.256	January 11, 2021	Barbara Lee (D-CA)	134	Passed the House.
117th Congress	A joint resolution to repeal the authorizations for use of military force against Iraq, and for other purposes.	S.J.Res.10	March 3, 2021	Tim Kaine (D-VA)	51	Died at the end of the 117th Congress (w/ H.R.256). S.J.Res.10 was calendered, but Leader Schumer refused to call it to a vote.

== Bipartisan portion of the roll call on H.R.256 (2021) ==
=== Democratic nay (1) on H.R.256 (2021) ===
- Elaine Luria

=== Republican yeas (49) on H.R.256 (2021) ===
- Andy Biggs
- Dan Bishop
- Lauren Boebert
- Mo Brooks
- Ken Buck
- Tim Burchett
- Michael Burgess
- Kat Cammack
- Madison Cawthorn
- Michael Cloud
- Tom Cole
- James Comer
- Warren Davidson
- Byron Donalds
- Randy Feenstra
- Matt Gaetz
- Mike Gallagher
- Mike Garcia
- Louie Gohmert
- Bob Good
- Lance Gooden
- Paul Gosar
- Marjorie Taylor Greene
- Morgan Griffith
- Yvette Herrell
- Jamie Herrera Beutler
- Darrell Issa
- Jim Jordan
- Nancy Mace
- Tracey Mann
- Thomas Massie
- Tom McClintock
- Peter Meijer
- Mary Miller
- Barry Moore
- Alex Mooney
- Jay Obernolte
- Bill Posey
- Tom Reed
- Tom Rice
- Matt Rosendale
- Chip Roy
- David Schweikert
- Victoria Spartz
- Michelle Steel
- Greg Steube
- Chris Stewart
- Tom Tiffany
- Fred Upton
