= American Trucking Ass'ns v. Atchison, Topeka & Santa Fe Railway Co. =

American Trucking Associations, Inc. v. Atchison, Topeka & Santa Fe Railway Co.
- Supreme Court of the United States

Decided May 29, 1967
- Full case name: American Trucking Ass'ns v. Atchison, Topeka & Santa Fe Railway Co.
- Citations: 387 U.S. 397 (more)

Holding
- The Interstate Commerce Commission has authority under the Interstate Commerce Act to promulgate railroad regulations with common carrier provisions.

Court membership
- Chief Justice Earl Warren Associate Justices Hugo Black · William O. Douglas; Tom C. Clark · John M. Harlan II; William J. Brennan Jr. · Potter Stewart; Byron White · Abe Fortas

Case opinions
- Majority: Fortas
- Dissent: Black, joined by Stewart
- Dissent: Harlan

Laws applied
- Interstate Commerce Act

American Trucking Associations, Inc. v. Atchison, Topeka & Santa Fe Railway Co., 387 U.S. 397 (1967), was a United States Supreme Court case in which the Court held that the Interstate Commerce Commission has authority under the Interstate Commerce Act to promulgate railroad regulations with common carrier provisions.
