= Liverpool, New York & Philadelphia Steamship Co. v. Commissioners of Emigration =

Liverpool, New York & Philadelphia S. S. Co. v. Commissioners of Emigration
- Supreme Court of the United States

Argued March 24–25, 1884 Decided January 5, 1885
- Full case name: Liverpool, New York & Philadelphia S. S. Co. v. Commissioners of Emigration
- Citations: 113 U.S. 33 (more) 5 S. Ct. 352; 28 L. Ed. 899; 1885 U.S. LEXIS 1648

Holding
- Courts should not prematurely determine whether a statute applies or does not apply to a given case based solely on pleadings and the text of the statute without considering the evidence.

Court membership
- Chief Justice Morrison Waite Associate Justices Samuel F. Miller · Stephen J. Field; Joseph P. Bradley · John M. Harlan; William B. Woods · Stanley Matthews; Horace Gray · Samuel Blatchford

Case opinion
- Majority: Matthews, joined by unanimous

Liverpool, New York & Philadelphia S. S. Co. v. Commissioners of Emigration, 113 U.S. 33 (1885), was a case decided by the United States Supreme Court. The Court held that courts should not prematurely determine whether a statute applies or does not apply to a given case based solely on pleadings and the text of the statute without considering the evidence. The Court further held that in cases where it is unclear whether an act applies, courts should not preemptively rule on the act's constitutionality, marking an early statement of the ripeness doctrine.

== Background ==
The plaintiff, Liverpool, New York & Philadelphia Steamship Company, had paid over 1,093,000 dollars to the Commissioners of Emigration of the State of New York. These payments, termed 'commutation moneys,' were fees collected per passenger under New York state laws concerning immigration. Believing these payments to be illegal under federal law, Liverpool, New York & Philadelphia Steamship Company sued the Commissioners of Emigration of the State of New York to demand repayment of the 'commutation moneys.'

The state of New York moved to dismiss the case based on a recently passed Act of Congress, which they argued legalized the collection of taxes on immigrants entering a state. The trial court agreed with the defendant and directed a verdict in favor of the state of New York without considering any other evidence. The plaintiff then appealed to the Supreme Court.

== Decision ==
In a unanimous decision, the Supreme Court reversed the judgment and remanded the case for a new trial. The Court held that the trial court had erred by refusing to hear evidence and directing a verdict based solely on the pleadings and the Act of Congress, and ordered a new trial.

== Impact ==
The decision is significant for its early statement of ripeness doctrine, which was developed further in Ashwander v. Tennessee Valley Authority. This standard holds that courts should not decide constitutional issues prematurely and should exhaust all other avenues beforehand.

== See also ==
- Head Money Cases
