= War Powers Resolution =

1973 U.S. federal law (50 U.S.C. 1541-48)

- Long title: Joint resolution concerning the war powers of Congress and the President.
- Enacted by: the 93rd United States Congress
- Effective: November 7, 1973

Citations
- Public law: 93-148
- Statutes at Large: 87 Stat. 555

Legislative history
- Introduced in the House as H.J.Res. 542 by Clement J. Zablocki (D–WI) on May 3, 1973; Committee consideration by House Foreign Affairs; Passed the House on July 18, 1973 (244–170); Passed the Senate on July 20, 1973 (75–20); Reported by the joint conference committee on October 4, 1973; agreed to by the Senate on October 10, 1973 (75–20) and by the House on October 12, 1973 (238–122); Vetoed by President Richard Nixon on October 24, 1973; Overridden by the House on November 7, 1973 (284–135); Overridden by the Senate and became law on November 7, 1973 (75–18)

The War Powers Resolution (also known as the War Powers Resolution of 1973 or the War Powers Act) (50 U.S.C. ch. 33) is a federal law intended to check the U.S. president's power to commit the United States to an armed conflict without the consent of the U.S. Congress. The resolution was adopted in the form of a United States congressional joint resolution. It provides that the president can send the U.S. Armed Forces into action abroad only by Congress’s statutory authorization, or in case of "a national emergency created by attack upon the United States, its territories or possessions, or its armed forces".

The bill was introduced by Clement Zablocki, a Democratic congressman representing Wisconsin's 4th district. The bill had bipartisan support and was co-sponsored by a number of U.S. military veterans. The War Powers Resolution requires the president to notify Congress within 48 hours of committing armed forces to military action and forbids armed forces from remaining for more than 60 days, with a further 30-day withdrawal period, without congressional authorization for use of military force (AUMF) or a declaration of war by the United States. The resolution was passed by two-thirds each of the House and Senate, overriding the veto of President Richard Nixon.

It has been alleged that the War Powers Resolution has been violated in the past. However, no allegations have resulted in successful legal actions taken against a president.

== Constitutional background ==
Under the United States Constitution, war powers are divided. Under Article I, Section 8, Congress has the power to:

- declare war
- grant Letters of Marque and Reprisal (i.e., license private citizens to capture enemy vessels)
- raise and support Armies (for terms up to two years at a time)
- provide and maintain a Navy
- make Rules for the Government and Regulation of the land and naval Forces
- provide for calling forth the Militia
- make Rules concerning Captures on Land and Water
- provide for organizing, arming, and disciplining, the Militia; and
- govern such Part of [the militia] as may be employed in the Service of the United States.

Section 8 further provides that the states have the power to:

- Appoint the Officers of the Militia; and
- train the Militia according to the discipline prescribed by Congress.

Article II, Section 2 provides that:

- "The president shall be Commander in Chief of the Army and Navy of the United States, and of the Militia of the several States, when called into the actual Service of the United States."

It is generally agreed that the commander-in-chief role gives the president power to repel attacks against the United States and makes the president responsible for leading the armed forces. The president has the right to sign or veto congressional acts, such as a declaration of war, and Congress may override any such presidential veto. Additionally, when the president's actions (or inactions) provide "Aid and Comfort" to enemies or levy war against the United States, then Congress has the power to impeach and remove (convict) the president for treason. For actions short of treason, they can remove the president for "Bribery, or other high Crimes and Misdemeanors", the definition of which the Supreme Court has left up to Congress. Therefore, the war power was intentionally split between Congress and the Executive to prevent unilateral executive action that is contrary to the wishes of Congress, and require a super-majority for legislative action that is contrary to the wishes of the president. Past presidential administrations have engaged the U.S. in conflict as well as directed U.S. military efforts without the approval of Congress. President Franklin D. Roosevelt directed the U.S. Navy to protect British shipping vessels during World War II as well as ordering the occupation of Greenland and Iceland.

== History ==
=== Background and passage ===
During the Vietnam War, the United States found itself involved for many years in situations of intense conflict without a declaration of war. Many members of Congress became concerned with the erosion of congressional authority to decide when the United States should become involved in a war or the use of armed forces that might lead to war. It was prompted by news leaking out that President Nixon conducted secret bombings of Cambodia during the Vietnam War without notifying Congress. The War Powers Resolution bill was a contest between Congress and the Presidency on who has specific rights regarding wartime authorities. According to the committee report "The issue concerns the 'twilight zone' of concurrent authority which the Founding Fathers of the United States gave the Congress and the President over the war powers of the National Government."

US President Nixon's opposition to the bill was noted by Representative Gerald R. Ford (who would become Nixon's vice president and presidential successor) who read aloud a telegram from the president in which Nixon warned he would veto the legislation due to its "dangerous and unconstitutional restrictions". The War Powers Resolution was passed by both the House of Representatives and Senate but was vetoed by President Richard Nixon. By a two-thirds vote in each house, Congress overrode the veto and enacted the joint resolution into law on 7 November 1973.

=== Provisions ===
In the absence of a declaration of war by the Congress, in any case in which the Armed Forces of the United States are introduced in hostilities, or in situations where imminent involvement in hostilities is clearly indicated by the circumstances, such use of the Armed Forces of the United States in hostilities pursuant to this Act shall be reported within 48 hours in writing by the president to the Speaker of the House of Representatives and the president pro tempore of the Senate, together with a full account of the circumstances under which such hostilities were initiated, the estimated scope and duration of such hostilities, and the constitutional and legislative authority under which the introduction of hostilities took place.

The president is to routinely consult with Congress until U.S. armed forces are no longer engaged in hostilities or have been removed. Reports are given to the House Committee of Foreign Affairs and to the Senate Foreign Relations Committee.

=== Implementation, 1993–2002 ===
With the War Powers Resolution's passing, both the deployment of troops to conflict and the stationing of troops past 60 days would now need prior congressional approval. The President would now need to routinely consult with Congress for the duration of the conflict. The resolution is considered to be a critically important bill in reestablishing congressional capabilities. As of November 2026 the War Powers Resolution Reporting Project lists 137 times presidents have submitted "48 hour reports."

Congress invoked the War Powers Resolution in the Multinational Force in Lebanon Act (P.L. 98-119), which authorized the Marines to remain in Lebanon for 18 months during 1982 and 1983. In addition, the Authorization for Use of Military Force Against Iraq Resolution of 1991 (Pub. L. 102–1), which authorized United States combat operations against Iraqi forces during the 1991 Gulf War, stated that it constituted specific statutory authorization within the meaning of the War Powers Resolution.

The Reagan Administration harbored extensive reservations about the War Powers Resolution's constitutionality and efficacy. Legal Advisor to the State Department Abraham Sofaer argued that the WPR's deadlines "creates unwise limitations on Presidential authority to deploy U.S. forces in the interests of U.S. national security" and that "the President's constitutional authority cannot in any case even be impermissibly infringed by statute." More specifically, the Administration sought to make clear that the resolution should not be applied to anti-terrorist operations, a use of force, according to Sofaer, "that is more analogous to law enforcement activity by policy in the domestic context than it is to the 'hostilities' between states."

On 9 November 1993, the House used a section of the War Powers Resolution to state that U.S. forces should be withdrawn from Somalia by 31 March 1994; Congress had already taken this action in appropriations legislation. Under President Bill Clinton, war powers were at issue in former Yugoslavia, Bosnia, Kosovo, Iraq, and Haiti, and under President George W. Bush in responding to terrorist attacks against the U.S. after September 11, 2001. "[I]n 1999, President Clinton kept the bombing campaign in Kosovo going for more than two weeks after the 60-day deadline had passed. Even then, however, the Clinton legal team opined that its actions were consistent with the War Powers Resolution because Congress had approved a bill funding the operation, which they argued constituted implicit authorization. That theory was controversial because the War Powers Resolution specifically says that such funding does not constitute authorization." Clinton's actions in Kosovo were challenged by a member of Congress as a violation of the War Powers Resolution in the D.C. Circuit case Campbell v. Clinton, but the court found the issue was a non-justiciable political question. It was also accepted that because Clinton had withdrawn from the region 12 days prior the 90-day required deadline, he had managed to comply with the act.

After the 1991 Gulf War, the use of force to obtain Iraqi compliance with United Nations resolutions, particularly through enforcement of Iraqi no-fly zones, remained a war powers issue. In October 2002 Congress enacted the Authorization for Use of Military Force Against Iraq Pub. L. 107–243 (text) (PDF) , which authorized US President George W. Bush to use force as necessary to defend the United States against Iraq and enforce relevant UN Security Council Resolutions. This was in addition to the Authorization for Use of Military Force of 2001.

=== Libya, 2011 ===
US Secretary of State Hillary Clinton testified to Congress in March 2011 that the Obama administration did not need congressional authorization for its military intervention in Libya or for further decisions about it, despite congressional objections from members of both parties that the administration was violating the War Powers Resolution. During that classified briefing, she reportedly indicated that the administration would sidestep the Resolution's provision regarding a 60-day limit on unauthorized military actions. Months later, she stated that, with respect to the military operation in Libya, the United States was still flying a quarter of the sorties, and The New York Times reported that, while many presidents had bypassed other sections of the War Powers Resolution, there was little precedent for exceeding the 60-day statutory limit on unauthorized military actions—a limit which the Justice Department had said in 1980 was constitutional. The US State Department publicly took the position in June 2011 that there was no "hostility" in Libya within the meaning of the War Powers Resolution, contrary to legal interpretations in 2011 by the US Department of Defense and the US Department of Justice Office of Legal Counsel.

May 20, 2011 marked the 60th day of U.S. combat in Libya (as part of the UN resolution) but the deadline arrived without President Barack Obama seeking specific authorization from the U.S. Congress. President Obama notified Congress that no authorization was needed, since the U.S. leadership had been transferred to NATO, and since U.S. involvement was somewhat "limited". In fact, as of 28 April 2011, the U.S. had conducted 75% of all aerial refueling sorties, supplied 70% of the operation's intelligence, surveillance, and reconnaissance, and contributed 24 percent of the total aircraft used in the operation. By September, the U.S. had conducted 26 percent of all military sorties, contributing more resources to Operation Unified Protector than any other NATO country. The State Department requested (but never received) express congressional authorization.

On Friday, 3 June 2011, the US House of Representatives voted (268-145) to rebuke President Obama for maintaining an American presence in the NATO operations in Libya, which they considered a violation of the War Powers Resolution. Yale Law professor Bruce Ackerman stated that Obama's position, "lacks a solid legal foundation. And by adopting it, the White House has shattered the traditional legal process the executive branch has developed to sustain the rule of law over the past 75 years."

=== Syria, 2012–2017 ===
In late 2012 or early 2013, at the direction of US President Barack Obama, the Central Intelligence Agency (CIA) was put in charge of Timber Sycamore, a covert program to arm and train the rebels who were fighting against Syrian president Bashar al-Assad, while the State Department supplied the Free Syrian Army with non-lethal aid. Following the use of chemical weapons in the Syrian Civil War on several occasions, including the Ghouta chemical attack on 21 August 2013, Obama asked Congress for authorization to use military force in Syria, which Congress rejected. Instead, Congress passed Continuing Appropriations Resolution, 2015 that specified that the Defense Secretary was authorized "...to provide assistance, including training, equipment, supplies, and sustainment, to appropriately vetted elements of the Syrian opposition and other appropriately vetted Syrian groups and individuals...." The bill specifically prohibited the introduction of US troops or other US forces into hostilities. The bill said, "Nothing in this section shall be construed to constitute a specific statutory authorization for the introduction of United States Armed Forces into hostilities or into situations wherein hostilities are clearly indicated by the circumstances."

In spite of the prohibition, Obama, and later US President Donald Trump, introduced ground forces into Syria, and the United States became fully engaged in the country, though these troops were primarily for training allied forces. On 6 April 2017, the United States launched 59 BGM-109 Tomahawk missiles at Shayrat airbase in Syria in response to Syria's alleged use of chemical weapons. Constitutional scholar and law professor Stephen Vladeck has noted that the strike potentially violated the War Powers Resolution.

In June 2015, Jim McGovern introduced H.Con.Res. 55 in the House which was cosponsored by five other representatives. The same month, the House voted (288–139) against the resolution. In March 2023, Matt Gaetz introduced H.Con.Res. 21 in the House, cosponsored by four other representatives. The same month, the House voted (321–103) against the resolution.

=== Yemen, 2018–2019 ===
S.J.Res. 7
- Long title: A joint resolution to direct the removal of United States Armed Forces from hostilities in the Republic of Yemen that have not been authorized by Congress.

Legislative history
- Introduced in the 116th United States Congress as S.J.Res. 7 by Bernie Sanders (I–VT) on January 30, 2019; Committee consideration by Committee on Foreign Relations; Passed the Senate on March 13, 2019 (54–46); Passed the House on April 4, 2019 (247–175); Vetoed by President Donald Trump on April 16, 2019

Bernie Sanders introduced S.J.Res. 54 in the Senate during the 115th Congress in February 2018, but the Senate voted to table the motion in March 2018. Interest grew in the bill after the assassination of Jamal Khashoggi in October 2018, with the Senate also approving S.J.Res. 69 holding Saudi Crown Prince Mohammed Bin Salman responsible for Khashoggi's death. The Senate voted (56–41) to invoke the War Powers Resolution in December 2018. However, the House of Representatives did not vote on the resolution before the conclusion of the 115th Congress.

S.J.Res. 7 was introduced in the 116th Congress in January 2019. The bill was approved by the Senate and the House of Representatives. The bill was vetoed by President Trump on 16 April 2019. On 2 May 2019, the Senate failed to reach the two-thirds majority vote in order to override the veto.

=== Iran, 2020 ===
In January 2020, Tim Kaine (D–VA) introduced S.J.Res. 63 in the Senate which was cosponsored by 33 other representatives, Bernie Sanders (I–VT) introduced S. 3159 in the Senate which was cosponsored by 13 other representatives, and Ro Khanna (D–CA) introduced H.R. 5543 in the House which was cosponsored by 106 other representatives.

The Trump administration stated that the attack on Qasem Soleimani was carried out in accordance with the War Powers Resolution under the Authorization for Use of Military Force (AUMF) Against Iraq Resolution of 2002. The legalities of using the AUMF for endless conflicts has been a source of debate.

S.J.Res. 68
- Long title: A joint resolution to direct the removal of United States Armed Forces from hostilities against the Islamic Republic of Iran that have not been authorized by Congress.

Legislative history
- Introduced in the 116th United States Congress as S.J.Res. 68 by Tim Kaine (D–VA) on January 9, 2020; Committee consideration by Committee on Foreign Relations; Passed the Senate on February 13, 2020 (55-45); Passed the House on March 11, 2020 (227-186); Vetoed by President Donald Trump on May 6, 2020

On 13 February 2020, the Senate passed S.J.Res. 68 (55–45). The Democratic-controlled House of Representatives passed it on 11 March 2020 (227–186). Trump vetoed the resolution on 6 May 2020, stating that it mistakenly "implies that the president's constitutional authority to use military force is limited to defense of the United States and its forces against imminent attack." Kaine stated Trump's veto could enable "endless wars" and "unnecessary war in the Middle East". The Senate attempted to override the veto the following day. The attempt needed at least 67 votes to override, with it failing by a vote of 49–44.

=== Niger, 2023 ===
In September 2023, Rand Paul introduced S.J.Res. 44 in the Senate, cosponsored by Mike Lee and Roger Marshall. In October 2023, the Senate voted (86–11) against the resolution.

=== Iran, 2025 ===
In June 2025, Thomas Massie introduced H.Con.Res. 38 in the House which was cosponsored by 94 other representatives. It was referred to a committee where it remained until March 2026. In the Senate, Tim Kaine introduced S.J.Res. 59 which failed to discharge from committee (47–53) and Bernie Sanders introduced the “No War Against Iran Act” (S. 2087) which was cosponsored by 7 other senators. The “No War Against Iran Act” was referred to a committee.

=== Caribbean and Venezuela, 2025–2026 ===
==== House ====
In the House:

- Jason Crow sponsored H.J.Res. 126, in September 2025, which was cosponsored by 55 other representatives
- Ilhan Omar sponsored H.Con.Res. 51, in September 2025, which was cosponsored by 23 other representatives
- Gregory Meeks sponsored H.Con.Res. 61, in November 2025, which was cosponsored by 41 other representatives
- Jim McGovern sponsored H.Con.Res. 64, in December 2025, which was cosponsored by 46 other representatives

==== Senate ====
In the Senate:

- Adam Schiff sponsored S.J.Res. 83, in September 2025, which was cosponsored by 8 other representatives.
- Tim Kaine sponsored S.J.Res. 90, in October 2025, which was cosponsored by 18 other representatives. Kaine also sponsored S.J.Res. 98, in December 2025, which was cosponsored by 30 other representatives.
- Ruben Gallego sponsored S.J.Res. 100, in December 2025, which was cosponsored by Tim Kaine.

On 8 January 2026, the Senate voted (52-47) to discharge S.J.Res. 98 from committee (“to direct the removal of United States Armed Forces from hostilities within or against Venezuela that have not been authorized by Congress”). On 14 January, Vice President JD Vance broke a (50–50) tie vote to block the resolution.

S.J.Res 83 and 90, in October and November 2025 respectively, both failed a motion to discharge.

=== Iran, 2026 ===
H.Con.Res. 86
- Long title: Directing the President, pursuant to section 5(c) of the War Powers Resolution, to remove United States Armed Forces from hostilities with Iran.
- Enacted by: the 119th United States Congress

Legislative history
- Introduced in the House as H.Con.Res. 86 by Gregory Meeks (D‑NY 5th) on April 20, 2026; Passed the House on June 3, 2026 (215–208); Passed the Senate on June 23, 2026; 4 months ago (50–48)

On May 1, 2026, the 60 day deadline, upon which, without congressional authorization, hostilities must cease, the president, Donald Trump sent a letter to Congress that said:

On April 7, 2026, I ordered a 2-week ceasefire. The ceasefire has since been extended. There has been no exchange of fire between United States Forces and Iran since April 7, 2026. The hostilities that began on February 28, 2026, have terminated.

Hours later, President Trump said "You know we’re in a war".

In June 2026, for the first time, both chambers of Congress agreed to a concurrent resolution under the War Powers Resolution, "Directing the President, pursuant to section 5(c) of the War Powers Resolution, to remove United States Armed Forces from hostilities with Iran."

==== House ====
1. March 5, 2026: The House blocked H.Con.Res. 38 (219–212). The resolution was introduced by Thomas Massie (R-KY-4) in June 2025. 210 Democrats, Massie and Warren Davidson voted yea. Tony Gonzales did not vote. 215 Republicans and Henry Cuellar, Jared Golden, Greg Landsman and Juan Vargas voted nay.
2. April 16, 2026: The House blocked H.Con.Res. 40 (214–213). The resolution was introduced by Gregory Meeks in June 2025. 212 Democrats and Thomas Massie voted yea. Warren Davidson voted present. Lauren Boebert, Thomas Kean Jr. and Nancy Mace did not vote. 212 Republicans, Jared Golden and Kevin Kiley voted nay.
3. May 14, 2026 the House blocked H.Con.Res. 75 (212–212). 209 Democrats, Thomas Massie, Brian K. Fitzpatrick, and Tom Barrett voted yea. 210 Republicans, Kevin Kiley and Jared Golden voted nay. Neal Dunn, Michael Guest, Thomas Kean Jr., Teresa Leger Fernández, Julia Letlow and Frederica Wilson did not vote.
4. June 3, 2026 the House passed H.Con.Res. 86 (215–208). 211 Democrats, Thomas Massie, Brian K. Fitzpatrick, Warren Davidson and Tom Barrett voted yea. 207 Republicans and Kevin Kiley voted nay. Pramila Jayapal, Dusty Johnson, Thomas Kean Jr., Morgan Luttrell, Nancy Mace, Ralph Norman, and Andy Ogles did not vote.
5. July 23, 2026 The House agreed to H.Con.Res. 89 (214–208).
6. September 15, 2026 The House agreed to H.Con.Res. 93 (220–204).

H.Con.Res. 87, H.Con.Res. 88, H.Con.Res. 91, H.Con.Res. 92, H.Con.Res. 94, H.Con.Res. 95, H.Con.Res. 99, H.Con.Res. 100, H.Con.Res. 101, H.Con.Res. 102, H.Con.Res. 103 and H.Con.Res. 104, H.Con.Res. 105, H.Con.Res. 110, H.Con.Res. 117, H.Con.Res. 126 have also been introduced "Directing the President, pursuant to section 5(c) of the War Powers Resolution, to remove United States Armed Forces from hostilities with Iran."

==== Senate ====
1. March 4, 2026: The Senate blocked S.J.Res. 104 (53–47), along party lines with the exceptions of Rand Paul (R-KY) who voted yea and John Fetterman (D-PA) who voted nay (to block the resolution).
2. March 18, 2026: The Senate blocked S.J.Res. 118 (53–47)
3. March 24, 2026: The Senate blocked S.J.Res. 116 (53–47)
4. April 15, 2026: The Senate blocked S.J.Res. 123 (52–47); Jim Justice did not vote.
5. April 22, 2026: The Senate blocked S.J.Res. 114 (51–46); Chuck Grassley, Dave McCormick and Mark Warner did not vote; Jim Justice voted nay.
6. April 30, 2026: The Senate blocked S.J.Res. 184 (50–47); Susan Collins voted yea; Jerry Moran, Patty Murray and Tommy Tuberville did not vote.
7. May 13, 2026: The Senate blocked S.J.Res. 163 (50–49); Susan Collins and Lisa Murkowski voted yea; Pete Ricketts did not vote.
8. May 19, 2026: The Senate did not block S.J.Res. 185 (50–47); Bill Cassidy, Susan Collins, Lisa Murkowski voted yea; John Cornyn, Thom Tillis and Tommy Tuberville did not vote
9. June 16, 2026: The Senate blocked S.J.Res. 172 (48–47); Bill Cassidy, Susan Collins and Lisa Murkowski voted yea; Michael Bennet, Cory Booker, Josh Hawley, Mitch McConnell and Bernie Sanders did not vote.
10. June 23, 2026: The Senate agreed to H.Con.Res. 86 (50–48); Bill Cassidy, Susan Collins and Lisa Murkowski voted yea; Mitch McConnell and Dave McCormick did not vote.
11. June 24, 2026: The Senate blocked S.J.Res. 185 (47–50); Susan Collins and Lisa Murkowski voted yea; Rand Paul voted present; Michael Bennet and Mitch McConnell did not vote.
12. September 24, 2026: The Senate blocked H.Con.Res. 89 (49–50); Susan Collins, Lisa Murkowski and Thom Tillis voted yea; Angela Alsobrooks did not vote.
13. November 19, 2026: The Senate blocked H.Con.Res. 93 (51—48); Susan Collins and Lisa Murkowski voted yea; Chris Murphy did not vote.

S.J.Res. 115, S.J.Res. 117, S.J.Res. 161, S.J.Res. 171, S.J.Res. 180, S.J.Res. 181, S.J.Res. 183, S.J.Res. 184, S.J.Res. 191, S.J.Res. 200, and S.J.Res. 211 have also been introduced "to direct the removal of United States Armed Forces from hostilities within or against the Islamic Republic of Iran that have not been authorized by Congress."

=== Cuba, 2026 ===
In March 2026, Nydia Velázquez introduced H.J.Res. 153 in the House and Tim Kaine introduced S.J.Res. 124 in the Senate. In April 2026, the Senate voted (51–47) against the resolution. In May 2026, Velázquez introduced H.Con.Res. 106 in the House and Kaine introduced S.J.Res. 193 in the Senate.

=== Lebanon, 2026 ===
1. June 4, 2026: The House blocked H.Con.Res. 84 (324–92). The resolution was introduced by Rashida Tlaib in April 2026. 91 Democrats and Thomas Massie voted yea. Betty McCollum and Derek Tran voted present. 206 Republicans, 117 Democrats and Kevin Kiley voted nay. Andy Barr, Mike Bost, Juan Ciscomani, Pramila Jayapal, Dusty Johnson, Thomas Kean Jr., Dan Meuser, Riley Moore, Ralph Norman, Ayanna Pressley, Chip Roy, and Derrick Van Orden did not vote.
2. June 30, 2026: The House voted against agreeing to H.Con.Res. 108 (235–189).

Tlaib also introduced H.Con.Res. 83.

== Questions regarding constitutionality ==
The War Powers Resolution has been controversial since it was passed. In passing the resolution, Congress specifically cites the Necessary and Proper Clause for its authority. Under the Necessary and Proper Clause, it is specifically provided that the Congress shall have the power to make all laws necessary and proper for carrying into execution not only its own powers but also all other powers vested by the Constitution in the Government of the United States, or in any department or officer thereof.

There is controversy over whether the War Powers Resolution's constraints on the president's authority as Commander-in-Chief are consistent with the Constitution. Presidents have therefore drafted reports to Congress required of the president to state that they are "consistent with" the War Powers Resolution rather than "pursuant to" so as to take into account the presidential position that the resolution is unconstitutional.

Philip Bobbitt puts forth one argument for the unconstitutionality of the War Powers Resolution. ‘The power to make war is not an enumerated power” and the notion that to "declare" war is to "commence" war is a "contemporary textual preconception". Bobbitt contends that the Framers of the Constitution believed that statutory authorization was the route by which the United States would be committed to war, and that 'declaration' was meant for only total wars, as shown by the history of the Quasi-War with France (1798–1800). In general, constitutional powers are not so much separated as "linked and sequenced"; Congress's control over the armed forces is "structured" by appropriation, while the president commands; thus the act of declaring war should not be fetishized. Bobbitt also argues that, "a democracy cannot .. .tolerate secret policies" because they undermine the legitimacy of governmental action.

A second argument concerns a possible breach of the "separation of powers" doctrine, and whether the resolution changes the balance between the Legislative and Executive functions. This type of constitutional controversy is similar to one that occurred under US President Andrew Johnson with the Tenure of Office Act (1867). In that prior instance, the Congress passed a law (over the veto of the president) that required the president to secure Congressional approval for the removal of Cabinet members and other executive branch officers. The Act was repealed in 1887; in Myers v. United States (1926), when the Supreme Court of the United States struck down a similar law of 1876 relating to the postmaster general, they stated obiter that the 1867 Act had been unconstitutional. When Andrew Johnson violated the Act, the House of Representatives impeached him; action in the Senate to remove him failed by one vote during his impeachment trial.

Here, the separation of powers issue is whether the War Powers Resolution requirements for Congressional approval and presidential reporting to Congress change the constitutional balance established in Articles I and II, namely that Congress is explicitly granted the sole authority to "declare war", "make Rules for the Government and Regulation of the land and naval Forces" (Article I Section 8, Clauses 11 and 14), and to control the funding of those same forces, while the Executive has inherent authority as Commander in Chief. This argument does not address the other reporting requirements imposed on other executive officials and agencies by other statutes, nor does it address the provisions of Article I Section 8 that explicitly gives Congress the authority to "make Rules for the Government and Regulation of the land and naval Forces".

The constitution specifically states that Congress is authorized "to provide and maintain a Navy" (Article 1, Section 8, Clause 13). The idea of "maintenance" of a Navy implies that Naval Forces would be a permanent fixture of national defense. Two types of Land Forces are described by the Constitution (Article 1, Section 8, Clauses 12 and 15): the Militia (armed citizenry organized into local defense forces and state volunteer regiments) which Congress can "call forth" and prescribe the "organizing, arming, and disciplining [training]" of, as Congress did in the Militia acts of 1792; and the Army, which Congress can "raise and support", through regular appropriation acts limited to no more than two years. This division matches how the Revolutionary War was fought, by the Continental Army, raised and supported by the Continental Congress, and local Militias and Volunteer Regiments, raised by the separate Colonies. After the war, under the Articles of Confederation, a small standing Army, the First American Regiment was raised and gradually increased in size over time by Congress before, following the Constitution's ratification, being transformed into the Regular Army. The availability of a standing Army, and the president of the United States being authorized as "Commander in Chief", implies his ability as a military commander to employ forces necessary to fulfill his oath to defend the constitution.

There is also an unresolved legal question, discussed by U.S. Supreme Court Justice Byron R. White in INS v. Chadha of whether a "key provision of the War Powers Resolution", namely 50 U.S.C. 1544(c), constitutes an improper legislative veto. (See Chadha, 462 U.S. 919, 971.) That Section 1544(c) states, "such forces shall be removed by the president if the Congress so directs by concurrent resolution". Justice White argues in his dissent in Chadha that under the Chadha ruling, Section 1544(c) would be a violation of the Presentment Clause. The majority in Chadha does not resolve the issue. Justice White does not address or evaluate in his dissent whether that section would fall within the inherent Congressional authority under Article I Section 8 to "make Rules for the Government and Regulation of the land and naval Forces". A post-Chadha argument for the constitutionality of the concurrent resolution is that the War Powers Resolution does not delegate legislative authority to the president, and that the Chadha ruling applies only when Congress seeks to revoke a delegation of its authority.

== Sources ==
- Grimmett, Richard Z. (February 14, 2006). "CRS Report for Congress: War Powers Resolution: Presidential Compliance" (PDF). Federation of American Scientists.
- United States Congress (November 7, 1973). "War Powers Resolution of 1973 (Public Law 93-148)". The Center for Regulatory Effectiveness.
- United States Congress (October 31, 1998). "H.R.4655: Iraq Liberation Act of 1998 (Public Law 105-338)". IraqWatch.org. Archived from the original on June 30, 2009.
- United States Congress (September 18, 2001). "Public Law 107-40: Joint Resolution: To authorize the use of United States Armed Forces against those responsible for the recent attacks launched against the United States (S.J. Res. 23)" (text). United States Government Printing Office.
- United States Congress (October 16, 2002). "Public Law 107-243: Authorization for the Use of Military Force Against Iraq Resolution of 2002 (H. J. Res. 114)" (text). United States Government Printing Office.
- Kinkopf, Neil. "The Congress as Surge Protector" (PDF). American Constitution Society for Law and Policy. p. 2. Archived from the original (PDF) on July 4, 2007. "The Supreme Court has been clear and unambiguous. When Congress, acting in the vast areas of overlapping power, tells the President 'no', the President must comply."
- Doumar, Robert G. (January 8, 2003). "Hamdi v. Rumsfeld Appeal from the United States District Court for the Eastern District of Virginia, at Norfolk (CA-02-439-2)" (PDF). United States Judiciary. Archived from the original (PDF) on February 4, 2012.
- Young, D. Lindley (February 24, 2003). "Amicus Curiae Brief in Support of Plaintiff's Appeal" (PDF). United States Judiciary. Archived from the original on February 4, 2012.
- Library of Congress (March 12, 2012). "Research Help: War Powers" (text). United States Government Library of Congress.
