= Frank v. Maryland =

- Supreme Court of the United States

Argued March 5, 1959 Decided May 4, 1959
- Full case name: Aaron D. Frank v. State of Maryland
- Citations: 359 U.S. 360 (more) 79 S. Ct. 804; 3 L. Ed. 2d 877

Case history
- Subsequent: Rehearing denied, June 15, 1959.

Holding
- Section 120 is valid, and appellant's conviction for resisting an inspection of his house without a warrant did not violate the Due Process Clause of the Fourteenth Amendment.

Court membership
- Chief Justice Earl Warren Associate Justices Hugo Black · Felix Frankfurter; William O. Douglas · Tom C. Clark; John M. Harlan II · William J. Brennan Jr. Charles E. Whittaker · Potter Stewart

Case opinions
- Majority: Frankfurter, joined by Clark, Harlan, Whittaker, Stewart
- Concurrence: Whittaker
- Dissent: Douglas, joined by Warren, Black, Brennan
- Overruled by
- Camara v. Municipal Court of City and County of San Francisco, 387 U.S. 523 (1967)

Frank v. Maryland, 359 U.S. 360 (1959), was a United States Supreme Court case interpreting the Fourth Amendment to the United States Constitution.

Frank refused to allow the health inspectors into his home citing the Fourth Amendment. Inspectors were trying to perform an administrative search for code violations, specifically a rat infestation, not a criminal investigation, so they did not believe they were violating the Fourth Amendment. The Court, in an opinion written by Felix Frankfurter, decided in favor of the inspectors claiming that the search would benefit the public more than Frank's interests in privacy.

The Supreme Court would reverse this decision eight years later in Camara v. Municipal Court of City and County of San Francisco, 387 U.S. 523 (1967), ruling that the City of San Francisco could not prosecute a person for refusing to consent to a search of their home by a city inspector, and the inspector may only search either by having consent, or must have a search warrant issued based on probable cause of a violation of law.

== See also ==
- List of United States Supreme Court cases, volume 360
- Wolf v. Colorado, 338 U.S. 25 (1949)
