= Ripeness =

Readiness of a case for litigation in US law

In United States law, ripeness refers to the readiness of a case for litigation; "a claim is not ripe for adjudication if it rests upon contingent future events that may not occur as anticipated, or indeed may not occur at all." For example, if a law of ambiguous quality has been enacted but never applied, a case challenging that law lacks the ripeness necessary for a decision.

The goal is to prevent premature adjudication; if a dispute is insufficiently developed, any potential injury or stake is too speculative to warrant judicial action. Ripeness issues most usually arise when a plaintiff seeks anticipatory relief, such as an injunction.

Originally stated in Liverpool, New York & Philadelphia Steamship Co. v. Commissioners of Emigration (1885), ripeness is one the seven rules of the constitutional avoidance doctrine established in Ashwander v. Tennessee Valley Authority (1936) that requires that the Supreme Court of the United States to "not 'anticipate a question of constitutional law in advance of the necessity of deciding it.'" The Court fashioned a two-part test for assessing ripeness challenges to federal regulations. The case is often applied to constitutional challenges to federal and state statutes as well. The Court said in Abbott Laboratories v. Gardner, 387 U.S. 136 (1967):

Without undertaking to survey the intricacies of the ripeness doctrine it is fair to say that its basic rationale is to prevent the courts, through avoidance of premature adjudication, from entangling themselves in abstract disagreements over administrative policies, and also to protect the agencies from judicial interference until an administrative decision has been formalized and its effects felt in a concrete way by the challenging parties. The problem is best seen in a twofold aspect, requiring us to evaluate both the fitness of the issues for judicial decision and the hardship to the parties of withholding court consideration.

In both Abbott Laboratories and its first companion case, Toilet Goods Association v. Gardner, 387 U.S. 158 (1967), the Court upheld pre-enforcement review of an administrative regulation. However, the Court denied such review in the second companion case because any harm from noncompliance with the FDA regulation at issue was too speculative in the Court's opinion to justify judicial review. Justice Harlan wrote for the Court in all three cases.

The ripeness doctrine should not be confused with the advisory opinion doctrine, another justiciability concept in American law.

== Comparison with other jurisdictions ==
=== United Kingdom ===
In English law there is no formal or fully developed doctrine of ripeness or prematurity as a strict jurisdictional bar. Courts nevertheless frequently address the issue by refusing permission for judicial review or declining relief on the ground that the claim is premature - that is, where the challenged administrative action or measure has not yet produced a concrete legal impact on the claimant or where a final decision has not been taken.

=== Germany ===
In German law, the functional equivalent to aspects of the U.S. ripeness doctrine is the requirement of a “legal need for judicial protection” (Rechtsschutzbedürfnis). This admissibility condition requires that the dispute has sufficiently crystallized and that the claimant has a legitimate interest in obtaining judicial relief. It is distinct from the doctrine of mootness, which addresses cases that have lost their practical relevance during proceedings.
