= Authorization for Use of Military Force =

Authorization for Use of Military Force under the War Powers Resolution appears in the title of several joint resolutions of the United States Congress. It may refer to:

- Authorization for Use of Military Force Against Iraq Resolution of 1991, authorizing the Gulf War, also known as Operation Desert Storm.
- Authorization for Use of Military Force of 2001, authorizing the use of military force against those responsible for the September 11 attacks (al-Qaeda and its affiliates), and thus the United States invasion of Afghanistan
- Authorization for Use of Military Force Against Iraq Resolution of 2002, also known as the Iraq Resolution, authorizing the Iraq War.
- Authorization for the Use of Military Force Against the Government of Syria to Respond to Use of Chemical Weapons, also known as the Syria Resolution, introduced in the Senate on September 6, 2013, but not enacted into law.
