= Campbell v. Clinton =

2000 American court case

- Court: United States Court of Appeals for the District of Columbia Circuit
- Full case name: Campbell v. Clinton
- Argued: October 22, 1999
- Decided: February 18, 2000
- Citation: 203 F.3d 19

Case history
- Prior history: 52 F. Supp. 2d 34 (D.D.C. 1999)

Court membership
- Judges sitting: Laurence Silberman, A. Raymond Randolph, David S. Tatel

Case opinions
- Majority: Silberman, joined by Tatel
- Concurrence: Silberman
- Concurrence: Tatel
- Concurrence: Randolph

Laws applied
- Article III; War Powers Resolution

Campbell v. Clinton, 203 F.3d 19 (D.C. Cir. 2000), was a case holding that members of Congress could not sue President Bill Clinton for alleged violations of the War Powers Resolution in his handling of the war in Yugoslavia.

== Background ==
=== Statute: the War Powers Resolution ===
The War Powers Resolution requires the President to submit a report within 48 hours "in any case in which United States Armed Forces are introduced … into hostilities or into situations where imminent involvement in hostilities is clearly indicated by the circumstances," and to "terminate any use of United States Armed Forces with respect to which a report was submitted (or required to be submitted), unless the Congress … has declared war or has enacted a specific authorization for such use of United States Armed Forces" within 60 days.

=== Legislative actions pursuant to War Powers Resolution ===
On March 26, 1999, two days after President Clinton announced the commencement of NATO air and cruise missile attacks on Yugoslav targets, he submitted to Congress a report, "consistent with the War Powers Resolution," detailing the circumstances necessitating the use of armed forces, the deployment's scope and expected duration, and asserting that he had "taken these actions pursuant to [his] authority … as Commander in Chief and Chief Executive." On April 28, Congress voted on four resolutions related to the Yugoslav conflict: It voted down a declaration of war 427 to 2 and an "authorization" of the air strikes 213 to 213, but it also voted against requiring the President to immediately end U.S. participation in the NATO operation and voted to fund that involvement.

=== Conflict between NATO and Yugoslavia ===
The conflict between NATO and Yugoslavia continued for 79 days, ending on June 11 with Yugoslavia's agreement to withdraw its forces from Kosovo and allow deployment of a NATO-led peacekeeping force. Throughout this period Pentagon, State Department, and NATO spokesmen informed the public on a frequent basis of developments in the fighting.

=== Parties ===
The lawsuit was filed before the end of hostilities by 31 members of Congress opposed to U.S. involvement in the Kosovo intervention, led by Tom Campbell of California.

=== Claim ===
The Congressmen sought a declaratory judgment that the President's use of American forces against Yugoslavia was unlawful under both the War Powers Clause of the Constitution and the War Powers Resolution ("the WPR"). Appellants claim that the President did submit a report sufficient to trigger the WPR on March 26, or in any event was required to submit a report by that date, but nonetheless failed to end U.S. involvement in the hostilities after 60 days.

=== District court ===
The district court granted the President's motion to dismiss for lack of standing.

== Opinion of the court ==
The appellate court affirmed. It held appellants had ample legislative authority it could exercise to stop appellee's war making, and thus, appellants lacked the power to challenge such executive action in court.
