= Toilet Goods Ass'n v. Gardner =

Toilet Goods Association, Inc. v. Gardner
- Supreme Court of the United States

Argued January 16, 1967 Decided May 22, 1967
- Full case name: Toilet Goods Association, Inc., et al. v. Gardner, Secretary of Health, Education, and Welfare, et al.
- Citations: 387 U.S. 158 (more) 87 S. Ct. 1520; 18 L. Ed. 2d 697

Court membership
- Chief Justice Earl Warren Associate Justices Hugo Black · William O. Douglas; Tom C. Clark · John M. Harlan II; William J. Brennan Jr. · Potter Stewart; Byron White · Abe Fortas

Toilet Goods Association, Inc. v. Gardner, 387 U.S. 158 (1967), was a case heard before the United States Supreme Court. It held that judicial review of a regulation's validity was inappropriate because the controversy was not ripe for adjudication. Since it was not clear whether or not an inspection would be ordered and the reasons had not been given by the Commissioner to justify his order, no primary conduct was affected and so no irremediable adverse consequences flowed from requiring a later challenge to the regulation by a manufacturer, who refused to allow inspection.

== Facts ==
The Toilet Goods Association was an organization of cosmetic manufacturers accounting for 90% of annual American sales in the field.

The Commissioner of the Food and Drug Administration promulgated a rule that stated, in part:
"(a) When it appears to the Commissioner that a person has:"
"(4) Refused to permit duly authorized employees of the Food and Drug Administration free access to all manufacturing facilities, processes, and the formulae involved in the manufacture of the color additives and intermediates from which such color additives are derived; he may immediately suspend certification service to such person and may continue such suspension until adequate corrective action has been taken."

== Decision ==
Justice Harlan wrote, "In determining whether a challenge to an administrative regulation is ripe for review a twofold inquiry must be made: first to determine whether the issues tendered are appropriate for judicial resolution, and second to assess the hardship to the parties if judicial relief is denied at that stage."

The issues were appropriate for judicial resolution. The regulation states that the commissioner may order an inspection and that a permit may be refused.

There was no excessive hardship on the parties. Unlike in other cases, failure to comply with the rule resulted in, at most, a suspension of a certification. Fines, seizures of goods, and criminal liability were not present.

== See also ==
- List of United States Supreme Court cases, volume 387
- Abbott Laboratories v. Gardner 387 U.S. 136 (1967)
