= John Morrison (intelligence officer) =

British intelligence officer

John Noble Lennox Morrison (born 14 July 1943, in Hexham), joined the UK's Defence Intelligence Staff (DIS) in 1967 as a desk-level intelligence analyst. During his Ministry of Defence (MoD) career he occupied a wide range of analytical and management positions in the DIS and elsewhere, including three tours in the Cabinet Office, culminating as Secretary to the Joint Intelligence Committee (JIC).

Morrison ended his official career as the senior civilian intelligence professional in the Defence Intelligence Staff, serving four years as Deputy Chief of Defence Intelligence and Head of the Defence Intelligence Analysis Staff. During this period he represented the MoD and DIS as a member of the JIC, UK representative to the NATO Intelligence Board and Head of Profession for MoD Intelligence Analyst classes. He was awarded the US Defence Intelligence Agency's Director's Award in 1999.

On leaving the DIS and the civil service in 1999, Morrison was selected by the parliamentary Intelligence and Security Committee (ISC) to be its first Investigator. He held this position until 2004, when his contract was prematurely terminated by the committee after he appeared on the UK BBC television programme Panorama and maintaining that Saddam Hussein was not in fact a threat to the UK. Morrison is a joint author of The Open Side of Secrecy: Britain's Intelligence and Security Committee, the first in-depth study of the ISC.

Since his retirement, Morrison has appeared on a number of TV and radio programmes, including Panorama, Today, The Politics Show, Newsnight, and Conspiracy Files (on the death of Dr David Kelly).
