= List of United States Supreme Court cases, volume 387 =

This is a list of all the United States Supreme Court cases from volume 387 of the United States Reports:

Case name	Citation	Date decided
In re Gault	387 U.S. 1	1967
Dombrowski v. Eastland	387 U.S. 82	1967
Iacurci v. Lummus Co.	387 U.S. 86	1967
Aero Mayflower Transit Co. v. United States	387 U.S. 90	1967
Rubio v. United States	387 U.S. 90	1967
Gerberding v. Tahash	387 U.S. 91	1967
Skolnick v. Kerner	387 U.S. 91	1967
Banks v. California	387 U.S. 92	1967
Am. Trucking Ass'ns, Inc. v. United States	387 U.S. 93	1967
Holding v. Blankenship	387 U.S. 94	1967
Blankenship v. Holding	387 U.S. 95	1967
Wirtz v. Operating Eng'rs	387 U.S. 96	1967
Moody v. Flowers	387 U.S. 97	1967
Sailors v. Bd. of Educ.	387 U.S. 105	1967
Dusch v. Davis	387 U.S. 112	1967
Boutilier v. INS	387 U.S. 118	1967
Abbott Lab's v. Gardner	387 U.S. 136	1967
Toilet Goods Ass'n, Inc. v. Gardner	387 U.S. 158	1967
Gardner v. Toilet Goods Ass'n, Inc.	387 U.S. 167	1967
SEC v. United Benefit Life Ins. Co.	387 U.S. 202	1967
Ne. Pa. Nat'l Bank & Tr. Co. v. United States	387 U.S. 213	1967
Hoffa v. United States	387 U.S. 231	1967
Krakoff v. Weaver	387 U.S. 235	1967
Tennessee v. City of Clarksville	387 U.S. 235	1967
Walker v. Wainwright	387 U.S. 236	1967
Chewie v. Lock	387 U.S. 236	1967
Mascuilli v. United States	387 U.S. 237	1967
United States v. Marshall & Ilsley Bank Stock Corp.	387 U.S. 238	1967
Julian Messner, Inc. v. Spahn	387 U.S. 239	1967
Greene v. Texas	387 U.S. 240	1967
Belcher v. Wisconsin	387 U.S. 241	1967
Frazier v. Lane	387 U.S. 242	1967
Barnett v. Nevada	387 U.S. 243	1967
FTC v. Universal-Rundle Corp.	387 U.S. 244	1967
Afroyim v. Rusk	387 U.S. 253	1967
Warden v. Hayden	387 U.S. 294	1967
Chi. & Nw. R.R. Co. v. Atchison T. & S.F.R.R. Co.	387 U.S. 326	1967
Reitman v. Mulkey	387 U.S. 369	1967
Am. Trucking Ass'ns, Inc. v. Atchison T. & S.F.R.R. Co.	387 U.S. 397	1967
Stoeckle v. Wolke	387 U.S. 423	1967
Sweet Briar Inst. v. Button	387 U.S. 423	1967
Cepero v. Indus. Comm'n	387 U.S. 424	1967
United States v. Cont'l Oil Co.	387 U.S. 424	1967
Cepero v. Colon	387 U.S. 425	1967
Markis v. United States	387 U.S. 425	1967
Delaney v. Florida	387 U.S. 426	1967
Patterson v. Va. Elec. & Power Co.	387 U.S. 426	1967
Schackman v. Arnebergh	387 U.S. 427	1967
Udall v. FPC	387 U.S. 428	1967
Comm'r v. Estate of Bosch	387 U.S. 456	1967
Denver & R.G.W.R.R. Co. v. United States	387 U.S. 485	1967
Camara v. Municipal Court	387 U.S. 523	1967
See v. City of Seattle	387 U.S. 541	1967
Denver & R.G.W.R.R. Co. v. Trainmen	387 U.S. 556	1967
Elliott v. Oregon	387 U.S. 571	1967
Clark v. Alabama	387 U.S. 571	1967
INS v. Lavoie	387 U.S. 572	1967
Aluminum Co. v. United States	387 U.S. 573	1967
Gills v. California	387 U.S. 574	1967
Camodeo v. United States	387 U.S. 575	1967
