= Fabricator (intelligence) =

Source agent that provides fraudulent or false information

A fabricator is an intelligence agent or officer that generates disinformation, falsehoods or bogus information, often without access to authentic resources. Fabricators often provide forged documents in order to substantiate their falsehoods. It is normal intelligence practice to place identified fabricators on a black list or to issue a burn notice on them and to recall intelligence sourced from them.

A fabricator is often cited as a reliable source behind black propaganda or atrocity propaganda involving disinformation or information that has not been properly vetted but suits the agenda of the disseminating organization. Multiple fabricators are usually used to justify a Big Lie. The process of vetting to weed out fabricators and double agents is also referred to as source validation. Recent examples of this include the case of the Niger uranium forgeries and the mobile weapons laboratory in Iraq. There are numerous cases in which it is alleged that the Soviet Union and its satellite states employed fabricators to pass disinformation to discredit activist emigres in the United States.

== Motivations of fabricators ==
Fabricators can be motivated by several factors:

- Fanaticism or ideology is often cited as the key reason behind fabricator activity. When fanaticism is involved or ideology becomes stronger than morals, fabrication may then be seen as a reasonable means to an end. The fabricator may invent the fake intelligence to help bring about a specific outcome to a situation.
- Mental illness, such as confabulation, often combined with alcoholism, causes some individuals to fabricate intelligence, most often done as part of a fantasy of being a secret agent or to gain official attention.
- Money is a strong incentive for some fabricators. Often, a reliable intelligence source agent will become a fabricator because of financial problems or greed. When the agent no longer has valid intelligence to sell to the conducting intelligence officer, the agent may decide to sell fabricated intelligence in order to satisfy need or greed.

== Notable fabricators ==
Virgilio Scattolini was the director of the Social Center of Catholic Action in the Vatican. As a former journalist, he had sold bogus Vatican information to various papers before World War II. During operation VESSEL in the fall of 1944, he was identified as a fabricator providing false intelligence on the Vatican to several agents of the OSS. The OSS acquired his information from two separate sources which eventually allowed OSS counterintelligence officer James Angleton to determine its fraudulent nature, but not before President Roosevelt was provided the reports as genuine.

Luis Manuel Gonzalez Mata-Lledo was a Spaniard who was fired in 1962 after being caught embezzling funds from his employer, the Dominican Republic Intelligence service. In 1963 he began a career as a fabricator. He attempted to sell fabricated intelligence and forged documents implicating Rafael Trujillo in a plot to assassinate President Juan Bosch, both in the Dominican Republic and at the Dominican Embassy in Paris. He later approached the U.S. Embassy in Algiers with another plot involving a "Third [Spanish] Republic Movement". Eventually he started posing as a Cuban intelligence officer peddling fabrications to the Brazilian Government, the U.S. Embassy in Brussels, Venezuela, Colombia and the Dominicans. By the end of the 1960s he was fabricating his own "KGB file cards" and "CIA file cards". By 1973 he had relocated to Paris where he continued to peddle fantastic fabrications.

Lemuel J. Walker was a Liberian who fantasized about becoming an "American Secret Service Agent". From 1963, at age 17, onward he repeatedly crafted forged documents on letterhead of United States Government agencies, including the White House, National Security Counsel (sic), and many others. He used these documents to substantiate wild plots of coups and invasions against African states by American forces.

Yehuda Gil was a Mossad agent who fabricated intelligence which nearly resulted in war between Israel and Syria.

Manucher Ghorbanifar was an Iranian fabricator who lived in Paris and fed bogus information to western intelligence agencies. He is suspected to have been directed by Iranian intelligence to provide disinformation to western intelligence agencies. He provided false information to the U.S. National Security Council with regard to the Iran-Contra arms for hostages process. Despite being labelled a fabricator by the CIA due to his role in the Iran-Contra Affair, he again peddled fabrications to the U.S. Defense Intelligence Agency during the build up to the 2003 invasion of Iraq in the war on terrorism at a meeting in Rome in December 2001 with representatives from the Undersecretary of Defense's office and a related follow-up meeting in June 2003. He approached the DoD officials specifically stating that he did not want to deal with the CIA. Later investigations revealed that policy officials from the Office of the Undersecretary of Defense circumvented the CIA and collected and used fabricated intelligence in the build up to the 2003 invasion of Iraq. Senator Rockefeller, representing the United States Senate Select Committee on Intelligence, stated that "clandestine meetings between DOD policy officials and Iranians in Rome and Paris in 2001 and 2003... were facilitated by Manucher Ghorbanifar, an Iranian exile and intelligence fabricator. ... Pentagon policy officials ... undertook the collection of sensitive intelligence. ... It was a rogue operation."

Ahmed Chalabi is an Iraqi politician and Iranian agent who fed and promoted false intelligence reports of weapons of mass destruction to Bush administration officials in order to encourage the 2003 invasion of Iraq.

Rafid Ahmed Alwan al-Janabi is an Iraqi citizen who peddled fabrications regarding Iraqi WMDs to western intelligence services. Known under his codename Curveball, his fabrications compromised the 2002 National Intelligence Estimate. He was a prolific fabricator with his information generating over 100 false intelligence reports for the BND and the United States. CIA officer Tyler Drumheller was a vocal opponent of the use of information sourced from Curveball as justification for the 2003 invasion of Iraq.

The Government of Iran is known to fabricate events to justify propaganda, some of which is based on lies dating back to the 1930s. The Iranian state owned Press TV is known to diffuse fabricated stories. Ofcom, Britain's independent media regulator, revoked Press TV's licence to broadcast in the UK and the German media regulatory office (BLM) made a request to SES Astra to have the channel removed from the satellite; a German court later decided that the ban was not justified.

Abdullah al-Omar is a Syrian propagandist who defected in 2012 during the Syrian civil war. He stated, "Our job was to fabricate, make deceptions and cover up for Bashar al-Assad's crimes".

== See also ==
- Disinformation
- Black propaganda
- Atrocity propaganda
- Big Lie
- Our Man in Havana, a book about a fabricator of intelligence for money.
