= Burn notice =

Statement issued by an intelligence agency asserting the unreliability of a source

A "burn notice" is an official statement issued by an intelligence agency to other agencies. It states that an asset or intelligence source is unreliable for one or several reasons, often fabrication, and must be officially disavowed. This is essentially a directive for the recipient to disregard or "burn" all information derived from that individual or group.

== Examples ==
- Ahmed Chalabi
- Curveball—"The CIA has since issued an official 'burn notice' formally retracting more than 100 intelligence reports based on his information."
- Manucher Ghorbanifar—1984 and 1986. "The CIA considered Ghorbanifar a dangerous con man and had issued a 'burn notice' recommending that no U.S. agency have any dealings with him."
- Ali Abdel Saoud Mohamed, who was recruited by the CIA and immediately revealed himself to be a double agent. "The CIA issued a burn notice to U.S. and allied intelligence services that Mohamed was not to be trusted."

== In popular culture ==
- The USA Network television series Burn Notice centers on Michael Westen (portrayed by Jeffrey Donovan), a former covert operative who has been burned and is trying to find those responsible.

== Kill notice ==
The related term kill notice or kill notification is used by news and photo agencies to declare manipulated or faked documents as "not to be used". In March 2024, the term attracted considerable press commentary after news agencies issued kill notices on the Mother's day photograph of Catherine, Princess of Wales, which was found to have been digitally altered. Phil Chetwynd, AFP's global news director, said that the kill notices issued on the photograph were more typical for photographs from the state news agencies of North Korea and Iran.

== See also ==
- Fabricator (intelligence)
- Kill file
