= Iraq disarmament crisis =

Early 2000s diplomatic crisis

In the Iraq disarmament crisis of the early 2000s, Iraq, led by president Saddam Hussein, was pressured by the United States and its other adversaries to destroy alleged stockpiles of weapons of mass destruction (WMD)—biological, chemical, and nuclear. In the 1980s, Iraq had programs to produce all three, but in the 1990s, the programs were ended, and the WMD were destroyed. The U.S.' rationale for its 2003 invasion of Iraq was that the country still had WMD, and would use them.

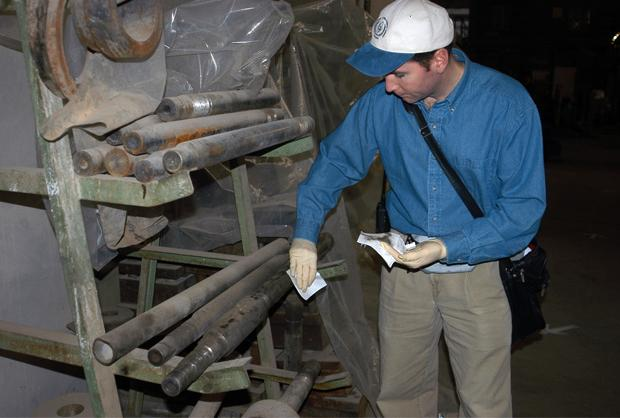
A UN weapons inspector in Iraq in November 2002

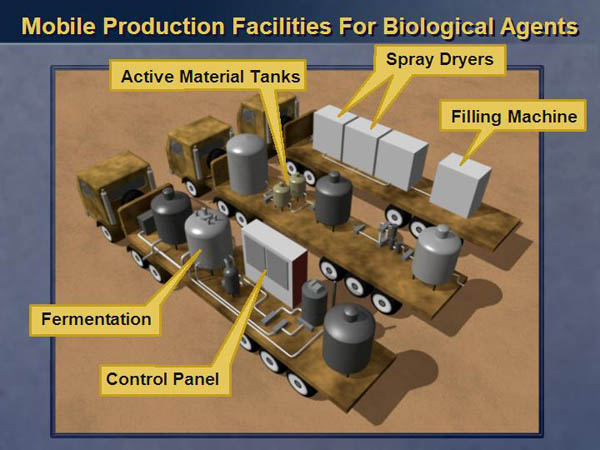
A diagram of Iraq's alleged mobile weapons laboratories, as presented to the United Nations by Colin Powell in 2003

In 1998, the U.S. officially declared its support for regime change in Iraq. Soon after al-Qaeda's September 11, 2001 attacks (9/11), U.S. president George W. Bush declared America's global "war on terror". Five Americans then died in anthrax attacks; the perpetrator is unconfirmed, but U.S. officials publicly speculated it was Iraq. Bush and his administration, spurred by members Dick Cheney and Donald Rumsfeld, alleged in 2002 that Iraq was sponsoring terrorism, linked to al-Qaeda, and had ongoing WMD programs; American officials cited Iraq buying aluminum tubes and documents alleging Iraq wanted uranium as proof of a nuclear weapons program. The U.S. threatened to invade Iraq if the alleged WMD were not destroyed, and their programs not ended. In November 2002, Saddam agreed to let United Nations (UN) inspectors search Iraq for WMD. The weapons were not found, and the U.S. then claimed they were still hidden.

The U.S. wanted international military backing for an invasion, but other countries, including fellow UN Security Council (UNSC) members, were unsupportive, citing no evidence for WMD. In February 2003, U.S. official Colin Powell spoke to the UNSC, alleging that Iraq had hid WMD before inspections, and could use WMD on American cities. Citing an Iraqi defector, Powell also claimed Iraq had mobile weapons facilities. Subsequently, the invasion received increased international support. A U.S.-led international coalition invaded Iraq in March, beginning the Iraq War (2003–2011). During the war, WMD were still not found, and Powell and Bush admitted in 2004 that they did not exist; Powell claimed the U.S. suffered an "intelligence failure", and he resigned from office. Throughout 2003, the uranium documents were found to be forged, and in 2011, the defector admitted to lying.

== Iraq and weapons of mass destruction ==
The Iraqi government started research on nuclear technology in 1956, when they received a research reactor (a nuclear reactor meant for research purposes) from the Soviet Union, and founded the Iraqi Atomic Energy Commission to study nuclear power. The Nuclear Threat Initiative writes that "these early activities were likely driven by peaceful intentions", to promote nuclear power following the U.S. government's "Atoms for Peace" initiative.

An international ban on distributing nuclear technology was first promoted in the United Nations by Ireland in 1961. In 1970, the Non-Proliferation Treaty (NPT), the first binding commitment by the international community to promote nuclear disarmament amongst nuclear weapon-equipped states, came into effect; at that point, the nuclear states were China, France, the United Kingdom, the United States, and the Soviet Union. Iraq signed the treaty in 1969. In 1975, the Biological Weapons Convention (BWC) treaty came into effect, internationally banning the creation of biological weapons: pathogens or toxins ("biological agents") like anthrax and ricin that are delivered in a weaponized manner, such as inside of missiles and grenades. Iraq signed the treaty in 1972.

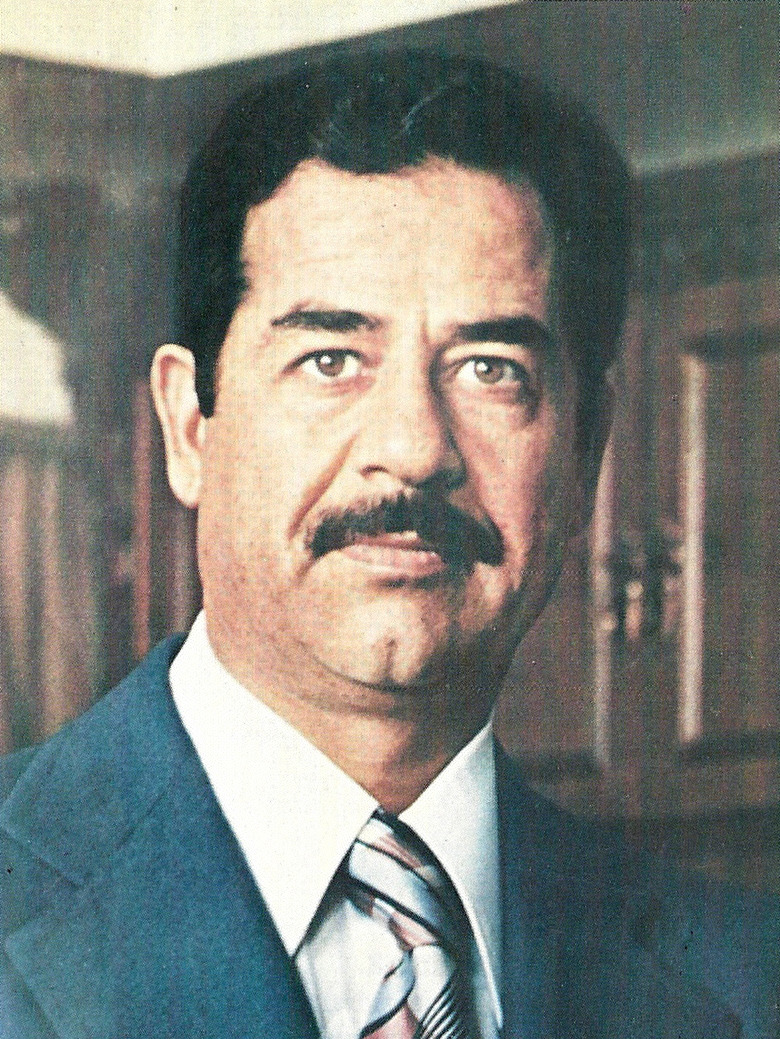
Saddam Hussein in 1979

In the early 1970s, while Saddam Hussein was Iraq's vice president, and its de facto ruler, the country began a nuclear weapons program, immediately violating the NPT. At the Tuwaitha Nuclear Research Center in Baghdad, Iraq installed two research reactors from France in 1976, and in 1979, installed two facilities acquired from an Italian company: one to manufacture nuclear fuel to run the nuclear power station, and one to separate plutonium and then handle it using a "hot cell" chamber. In 1975, Saddam stated that their purchase of a research reactor from France represented "the first Arab attempt at nuclear arming".

=== Presidency of Saddam Hussein ===
Saddam, a Sunni Arab, was the president of Iraq from 1979 to 2003. His government violently oppressed Iraqi Shia Arabs, who mostly live in the country's south, as well as the Iraqi Kurds, non-Arab Sunnis in the northern Iraqi Kurdistan region. The center of Iraq, which includes the capital Baghdad and the major cities of Fallujah and Tikrit, mostly contains Sunni Arabs. and is called the "Sunni Triangle". Saddam intentionally filled with his government with Sunni Arabs, creating a base of support for him in the triangle, so while the area only made up 15% to 20% of Iraq's population as of October 2003, it cemented his ability to opress his opposition.

==== Iran–Iraq War ====
In 1980, Iraq invaded neighboring Iran, beginning the Iran–Iraq War. Saudi Arabia, Kuwait, and other Gulf Arab states financed Iraq's war effort, while France and the Soviet Union sold weapons to Iraq. The U.S. generally and openly supported Iraq, but secretly sold weapons to Iran to deal with a hostage crisis in Lebanon, and fund the Nicaraguan Contras. Iran was also supported by Libya and Syria. The war ended in a ceasefire in 1988, after major losses on both sides.

Paul Wolfowitz, the military analyst for the U.S. Department of Defense (DOD) under president Ronald Reagan, formulated a policy with regard to Iraq and other "potential aggressor states", dismissing "containment" in favor of "preemption", with the goal of striking first to eliminate threats. This policy was short-lived, however, and president Bill Clinton, along with George H. W. Bush, Colin Powell, and other former Bush administration officials, dismissed calls for preemption in favor of continued containment. This was the policy of George W. Bush as well for his first several months in office.

==== Gulf War ====
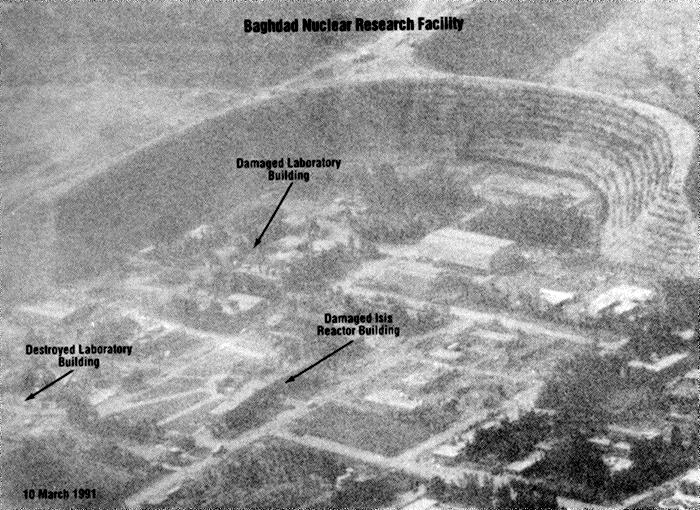
The Tuwaitha Nuclear Research Facility in Baghdad on 10 March 1991, after it was bombed by the U.S. in the Gulf War

In 1990, a diplomatic crisis occurred in which Saddam accused Kuwait, Iraq's neighbor, of stealing Iraqi oil. On 2 August, Iraq began an invasion of Kuwait, which began the Gulf War. Kuwait's allies, included the U.S., built up troops over the following months, and in 1991, began an air campaign and land invasion of Kuwait that forced the Iraqi military to retreat across the Iraq–Kuwait border.

==== After the Gulf War ====
Following the Gulf War, the Iraqi Army was reduced to 23 divisions with a total of about 375,000 troops. The Iraqi Air Force was reduced to less than 300 aircraft. The Iraqi Navy was almost completely destroyed, and its few remaining operational vessels were in a poor state of repair, limiting their capabilities to that of limited mining and raiding missions. Any rebuilding that was done went into the Republican Guard, and the formation of the Special Republican Guard.

In the decade after the Gulf War, the United Nations Security Counsel (UNSC) passed sixteen resolutions calling for the complete elimination of Iraqi weapons of mass destruction. Member states communicated their frustration over the years that Iraq was impeding the work of the UN Special Commission and failing to take seriously its disarmament obligations. Iraqi security forces had on several occasions physically prevented weapons inspectors from doing their job and in at least one case, took documents from them.

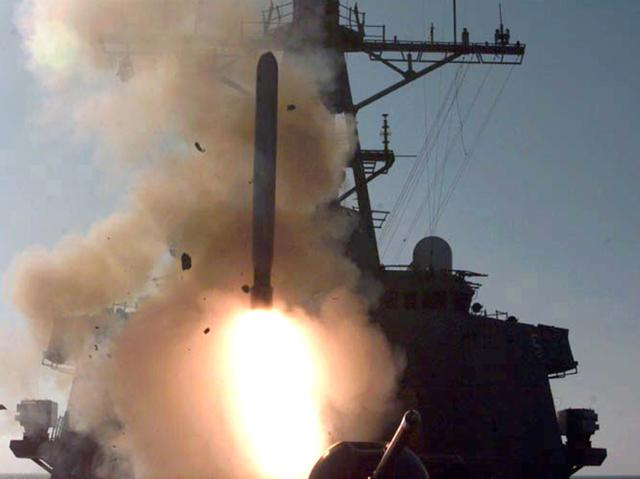
A Tomahawk cruise missile being fired by the U.S. at Iraq during Operation Desert Fox in 1998

==== U.S. support for regime change in Iraq ====
On 29 September 1998, the U.S. Congress passed the Iraq Liberation Act supporting the efforts of Iraqi opposition groups to remove Saddam from office. The Act was signed by Clinton on 31 October 1998. That same day, Iraq announced it would no longer cooperate with UN weapons inspectors.

The UN, under Kofi Annan, brokered a deal wherein Iraq would allow weapons inspectors back into the country. Iraq ceased cooperating with inspectors only days later. The inspectors left the country in December. Inspectors returned the following year as part of the UN Monitoring, Verification and Inspection Commission (UNMOVIC).

=== Presidency of George W. Bush ===
George W. Bush was inaugurated as U.S. president on 20 January 2001. His vice president was Dick Cheney. Multiple outlets write that Cheney had the most powerful and influential U.S. vice presidency in history. Before he took office, he had been Secretary of Defense under George H. W. Bush, as well as the CEO of Halliburton, an oil and engineering company with an extensive list of U.S. military contracts; he still had financial ties to the company while in office. Initially, George W. Bush's Secretary of State was Colin Powell, and his Secretary of Defense was Donald Rumsfeld.

== Crisis (2001–2003) ==
=== 2001 ===
==== 11 September attacks ====
On 11 September 2001 (9/11), the Islamic extremist group al-Qaeda, led by Osama bin Laden, enacted coordinated terrorist attacks against the U.S. 19 members of al-Qaeda hijacked four American commercial airliners in an attempt to crash them into national landmarks. Two were crashed into the World Trade Center in New York City, causing it to collapse. American Airlines Flight 77 was crashed into the DOD's headquarters, the Pentagon in Virginia. United Airlines Flight 93 crashed in a field in Pennsylvania; while the hijackers had intended to attack Washington, D.C., the other passengers and crew attempted to take back the plane's cockpit back from the hijackers, causing the crash. The four attacks directly killed at least 2,996 people, including all of the hijackers. An estimated 25,000 people were injured.

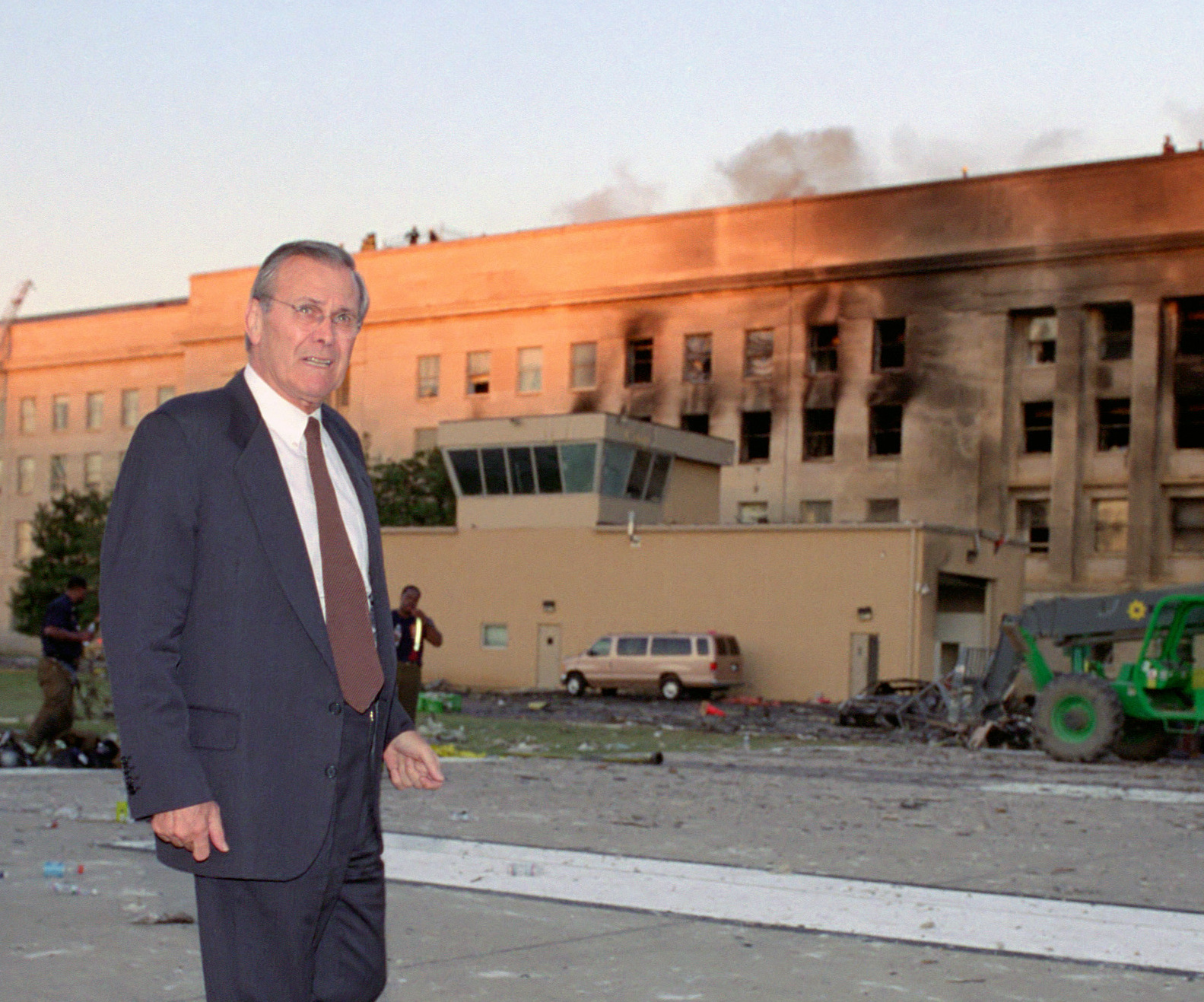
Donald Rumsfeld during the 11 September attacks, surveying the damage to the Pentagon from American Airlines Flight 77's crash

At 9:52 a.m. EST, 15 minutes after the Flight 77 crash, the National Security Agency (NSA) intercepted a phone call from a deputy of bin Laden in Afghanistan to someone in the Republic of Georgia. The deputy said he had "heard good news", and that another target would soon be attacked. Flight 93's crash followed this, at 10:03. Donald Rumsfeld was told about the call at 12:05 p.m., and within hours, he was told that U.S. intelligence had looked up the flight manifests of the hijacked planes, and found three members linked to al-Qaeda—one to al-Qaeda's USS Cole bombing in 2000 that killed U.S. Navy sailors. At 2:40 p.m., as Rumsfeld was in the National Military Command Center at the Pentagon, he ordered the military to attack Iraq; aides that were near him said later that he did not have evidence for Iraq being involved in the attacks. The aides took notes that quoted Rumsfeld as saying: "Go massive. Sweep it all up. Things related and not". One message he sent to military commanders wrote:

Best info fast. Judge whether good enough hit S.H. [Saddam Hussein] at same time. Not only UBL. [Usama bin Laden]

The attack on Iraq ultimately did not happen, while Rumsfeld's order remained a secret for a year. Throughout the day, Bush was also told about the phone call and the manifest names. That night, he stated in a speech to the American public:

"The search is underway for those who are behind these evil acts. ... We will make no distinction between the terrorists who committed these acts, and those who harbor them."

Before retiring to bed, he wrote in his diary that "we think it's Osama bin Laden."

==== Aftermath of 9/11 ====
In the following days, U.S. officials threatened the Taliban government of Afghanistan to give up bin Laden, whom they were harboring, or else face military action. Cheney stated: "if you provided sanctuary to terrorists, you face the full wrath of the United States". On 16 September, Bush stated that the perpetrators of 9/11 "have declared war on America", and that the U.S. was now fighting a "war on terrorism". Dick Cheney, using his unique influence, became a main architect of what has since been named America's "war on terror". 9/11 brought to life Wolfowitz's and other "hawks'" advocacy for preemptive action; Iraq was widely agreed to be a likely subject of this new policy. Powell continued to support the philosophy behind containment.

Starting on 18 September, and lasting for weeks, multiple envelopes containing both letters and particles of anthrax were mailed to various targets in the U.S. in a bioterrorist attack. Five people died from 5 October to 22 November. The letters were short, and contained phrases that implied an Islamic extremist motivation, such as "9-11-01", "DEATH TO AMERICA", and "ALLAH IS GREAT". Federal authorities first investigated the letters in relation to 9/11. The investigation went on for years, and in 2008, authorities' main suspect became Bruce Edward Ivins, who soon died by suicide. The FBI and other agencies later released a report that concluded Ivins was the sole perpetrator; a subsequent review by the National Academy of Sciences of the scientific evidence presented by the FBI found that it was not conclusive enough to definitely prove their claim.

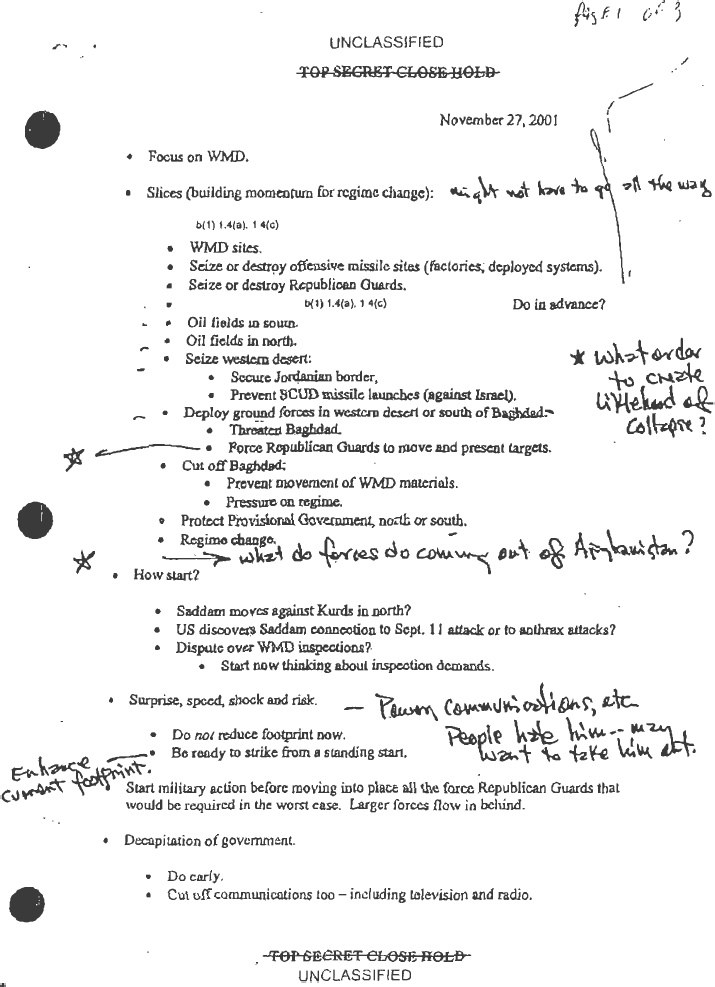
The 27 November 2001 Donald Rumsfeld memo

On 27 November, a memo was made to list Rumsfeld's planned talking points for a meeting with Army General Tommy Franks, commander of the U.S. Central Command. The memo was declassified in 2010. It first says to "Focus on WMD", and lists tasks needed to be done in advocating for "regime change". These include "WMD sites", and "Cut off Baghdad - Prevent movent of WMD materials". On how to start regime change, it proposes:

- Saddam moves against Kurds in north?
- U.S. discovers Saddam connection to Sept. 11 attack or to anthrax attacks?
- Dispute over WMD inspections?
  - Start thinking now about inspection demands.

=== 2002 ===
In 2002, the U.S. continued to call for regime change in Iraq and threatened to use military force to overthrow the Iraqi government unless Iraq rid itself of all WMD it supposedly possessed and convinced the UN that it had done so.

On 26 August, Cheney stated:

“There is no doubt that Saddam Hussein now has weapons of mass destruction. There is no doubt he is amassing them to use against our friends, against our allies, and against us."

Several close allies of the U.S. (e.g. Germany, Belgium and France) opposed a military intervention because they asserted it would increase rather than decrease the risk of terrorist attacks. Although the U.K. and other members of the EU and NATO supported the U.S. position, opinion polls showed that in general, their populations were against an attack, especially an attack without clear UNSC support.

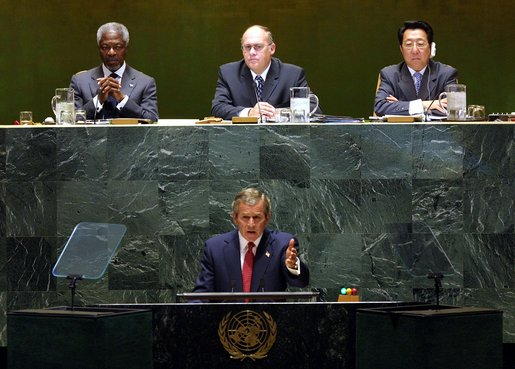
Bush (below) addresses the UN General Assembly on 12 September 2002, outlining the U.S.' case against Iraq

Rumsfeld's command to attack Iraq on 9/11 was first made public on 4 September 2002. CBS News wrote at the time:

Now, nearly one year later, there is still very little evidence Iraq was involved in the Sept. 11 attacks. But if these notes are accurate, that didn't matter to Rumsfeld.

On 7 October, Bush stated:

"[After the] Gulf War, the Iraqi regime was required to destroy its weapons of mass destruction, to cease all development of such weapons, and to stop all support for terrorist groups. The Iraqi regime has violated all of those obligations. It possesses and produces chemical and biological weapons. It is seeking nuclear weapons. It has given shelter and support to terrorism, and practices terror against its own people. The entire world has witnessed Iraq's eleven-year history of defiance, deception and bad faith."

On 9 October, the U.S. Congress passed the Iraq Resolution, which explicitly authorized the president to use the U.S. Armed Forces as he determines to be necessary and appropriate. On October 11, Russian president Vladimir Putin met with British prime minister Tony Blair. At a news conference, Putin said:

"Russia does not have in its possession any trustworthy data that supports the existence of nuclear weapons or any weapons of mass destruction in Iraq and we have not received any such information from our partners as yet."

The Bush administration began a military buildup in the region, and after pushing hard gained passage of UNSC Resolution 1441, which determined that Iraq was in material breach of Resolution 687 because it had not fully carried out its obligations to disarm.

Led by Hans Blix, head of UNMOVIC; and Mohamed ElBaradei; Director General of the International Atomic Energy Agency (IAEA), the Resolution brought weapons inspectors back to Iraq in November 2002. They began visiting sites where WMD production was suspected, but they found no evidence of such activities, except for 18 undeclared, empty 122 mm chemical rockets that were destroyed under UNMOVIC supervision. P. 30 Inspectors also found that the Al-Samoud 2 and Ababil-100 missiles violated the UN range restrictions, the former also being partially destroyed under UNMOVIC supervision.

=== 2003 ===
Since Iraq was not actively disarming themselves of its alleged WMD and hid them from UN inspectors, the U.S. and its allies claimed they had the right to assume that Iraq was holding WMD. If the UN failed to force compliance, the U.S. and the U.K.—as parties of the 1991 conflict—would invade Iraq without the UN, as they had already done in their intervention in the Kosovo War.

==== February ====
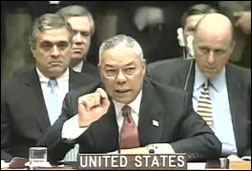
Colin Powell holding a model vial of anthrax while giving a presentation to the United Nations Security Council in February 2003

On 5 February, Colin Powell gave a speech to the UNSC, in which he detailed Iraq's alleged WMD programs. When speaking on Iraq's supposed biological program, he held up a model vial of anthrax, and said:

"This is just about the amount of a teaspoon—less than a teaspoon full of dry anthrax in an envelope shutdown the United States Senate in the fall of 2001. This forced several hundred people to undergo emergency medical treatment and killed two postal workers just from an amount just about this quantity that was inside of an envelope. ... Hussein could have produced 25,000 liters ... [or] tens upon tens upon tens of thousands of teaspoons."

In a 10 February joint declaration by France, Germany, and Russia, French president Jacques Chirac remarked:

"[France is] ready to envisage everything that can be done under [Resolution] 1441. ... But I repeat that every possibility offered by the present resolution must be explored, that there are a lot of them and they still leave us with a lot of leeway when it comes to ways of achieving the objective of eliminating any weapons of mass destruction which may exist in Iraq. I'd like nevertheless to note that, as things stand at the moment, I have, to my knowledge, no indisputable proof in this sphere."

==== March ====
On 7 March, Hans Blix reported increased Iraqi cooperation with UNMOVIC throughout February, but it was still not "immediate" and "unconditional" as called for by Resolution 1441. He informed the UNSC that "it will not take years, nor weeks, but months" to verify whether Iraq had complied with its disarmament obligations.

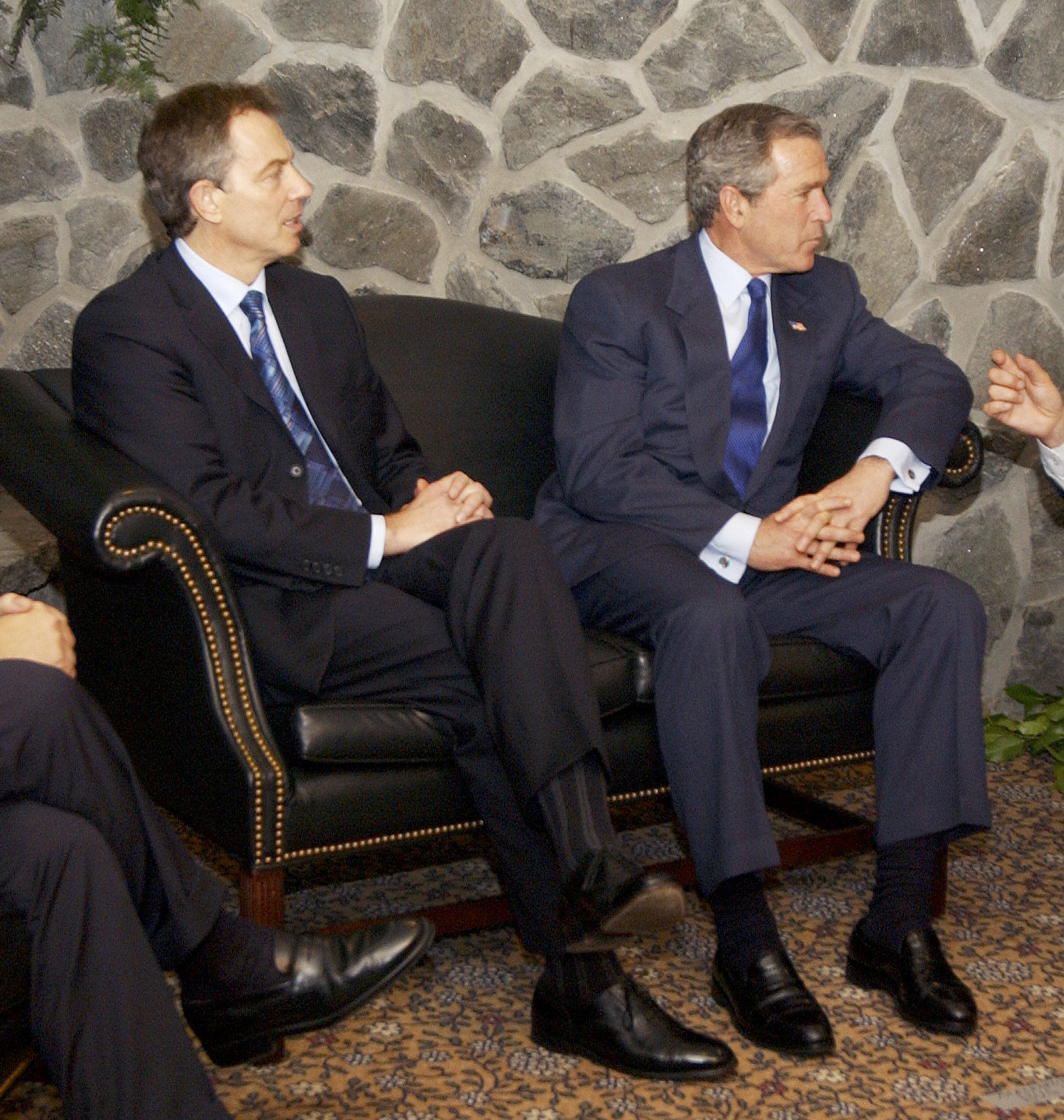
Tony Blair (left) and Bush in the Azores on 16 March 2003

Bush and Tony Blair met in the Azores islands for an "emergency summit" over the weekend of 15 and 16 March, after which Bush declared that, despite Blix's report, "diplomacy had failed" to compel Iraq to comply with UN Resolution inspection requirements, and stated his intention to use military force to attack Iraq in what was, according to the Bush administration, compliance with the threat of "serious consequences" in Resolution 1441.

On 17 March, Bush claimed in a speech to the American public:

"Intelligence gathered by this and other governments leaves no doubt that the Iraq regime continues to possess and conceal some of the most lethal weapons ever devised. This regime has already used weapons of mass destruction against Iraq's neighbors and against Iraq's people."

That same day, Peter Goldsmith, Attorney General for England and Wales, set out his government's legal justification for an invasion of Iraq. He said that the 1990 UNSC Resolution 678 authorised force against Iraq, which was suspended but not terminated by the 1991 Resolution 687, which imposed continuing obligations on Iraq to eliminate its WMD. A material breach of Resolution 687 would revive the authority to use force under Resolution 678.

On 19 March, right before the invasion of Iraq, Bush made another address to the American public. In it, he said:

"American and coalition forces are in the early stages of military operations to disarm Iraq, to free its people, and to defend the world from grave danger."

Bush's speech on 17 March

Bush's speech on 19 March

== Weakening evidence for WMD (2003) ==
=== During the invasion of Iraq ===
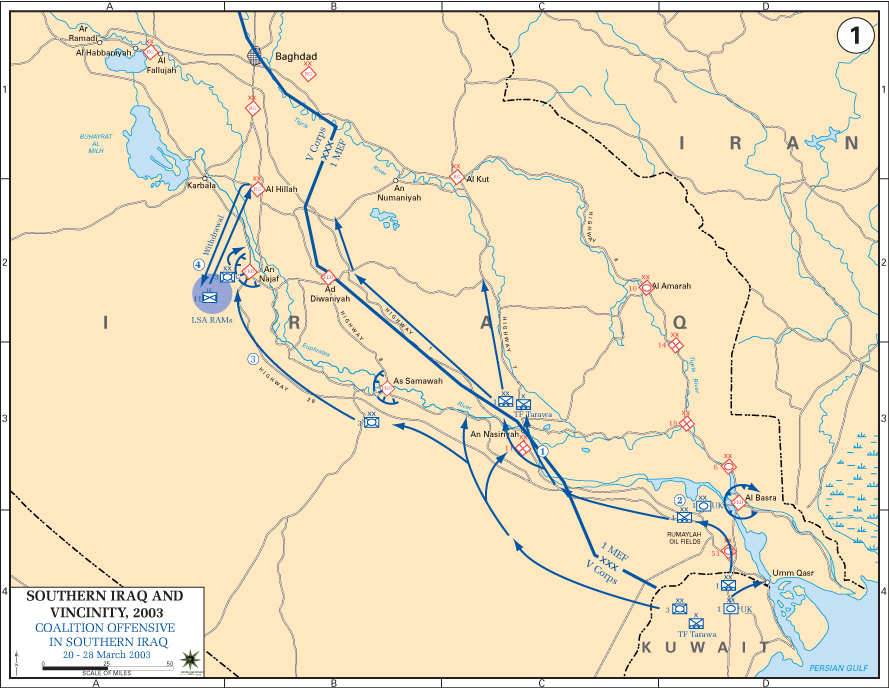
Map of the 2003 invasion of Iraq from 20 to 28 March

The invasion of Iraq officially began on 20 March 2003, with U.S. strategic bombings of Iraqi government and military targets. Coalition forces in Kuwait then crossed into Iraq, invading from the south on up. From 25 March to 4 April, as coalition troops positioned outside of Baghdad, they launched attacks at Iraqi troops inside.

On 2 April, the Council of Foreign Relations (CFR) wrote for The New York Times that while Iraq had not used any WMD on U.S. forces, and the U.S. had not "come close to finding any banned weapons", "few experts" believed that Iraq had no WMD outright, as the U.S. only yet controlled southern Iraq; DOD officials were reported as saying "the hunt is still in its early stages", and former UN inspectors as saying "Saddam Hussein has always kept his weapons of mass destruction" in central Iraq, with his Sunni base of support.

From 4 to 9 April, the coalition launched a raid into Baghdad, while Iraqi troops kept up their resistance. On the 9th, the resistance collapsed, and U.S. forces took control of the city. Saddam's government officially dissolved, as he and other officials went into hiding. Bush declared an end to major combat operations in Iraq on 1 May, as the coalition began an occupation of the country to set up a new government that would replace Saddam's. Iraqi opposition to the occupation quickly coalesced into the Iraqi insurgency, which fought coalition troops and the new government for years, extending the Iraq War until 2011. On 13 December 2003, Saddam was captured in Tikrit.

=== After the invasion ===
After the invasion of Iraq, the Iraq Survey Group, headed by David Kay, was formed to find the alleged WMD. Apart from a small quantity of degraded pre-1991 shells, nothing was found.

On 6 June 2003, CNN law columnist John Dean wrote that before the invasion, Bush "had made a number of unequivocal statements" regarding the reason for going to war to Congress, and "[now] it is clear that many of his statements appear to be false". Dean wrote that this could be an impeachable offense:

[If] Bush has taken Congress and the nation into war based on bogus information, he is cooked. Manipulation or deliberate misuse of national security intelligence data, if proven, could be 'a high crime' under the Constitution's impeachment clause. It would also be a violation of federal criminal law, including the broad federal anti-conspiracy statute, which renders it a felony 'to defraud the United States, or any agency thereof, in any manner, or for any purpose'.

He also wrote that "the story of the missing WMD is far from over. And it is too early, of course, to draw conclusions."

== Aftermath ==
=== Efforts to impeach Bush ===
USA Today wrote in 2015 that in the years after Iraqi WMD were not found, some Congressional Democrats called for Bush to be impeached, but it ultimately never came to a vote, as "Democratic leaders wanted nothing to do with" impeachment after concluding years prior that it "is such an extreme response to presidential bad behavior that it can hurt accusers more than the accused"; after Bill Clinton was impeached by Congressional Republicans in 1998 for lying to Congress about a sex scandal, Americans' approval rating of Clinton increased, while the Republican Party's rating dropped, despite Americans also not approving of Clinton's behavior in the scandal.

=== Retrospective views ===
In 2008, businessman and future U.S. president Donald Trump called for U.S. House Speaker Nancy Pelosi to impeach Bush over the WMD narrative. During Trump's 2016 presidential campaign, he reiterated this in a debate against fellow candidate Jeb Bush—George W. Bush's brother; Trump stated that the Iraq War "destabilized the Middle East", and that the Bush administration "lied—they said there were weapons of mass destruction. There were none, and they knew there were none." Jeb replied that "my brother was building a security apparatus to keep us safe. And I'm glad he did."

In May 2022, Bush spoke at his Presidential Center in Texas about the recent Russian invasion of Ukraine, which was initiated by Vladimir Putin, again serving as Russia's president. Bush misspoke when criticizing Putin's decision: "the decision of one man to launch a wholly unjustified and brutal invasion of Iraq. I mean, Ukraine." He then chuckled, and said quietly: "Iraq, too".

=== Alleged reprisals of American WMD rhetoric ===
In 2025, Haaretz wrote that Israeli prime minister Benjamin Netanyahu was using the U.S.' pre-Iraq War rhetorical "playbook" to justify continuing the Gaza war (2023–present) and blocking aid delivery to the Gaza Strip—using Hamas's threat to Israel in the place of using the WMD threat to U.S. allies to justify the Iraq War. Regarding aid to Gaza, Netanyahu claimed that Hamas was regularly stealing aid shipments to help them fight Israel; Israeli military officials later said this was baseless. Haaretz noted that Netanyahu himself was involved in shaping the WMD narrative, having testified to the U.S. Congress in 2002 that deposing Hussein would have "enormous positive reverberations" on the Middle East.

In 2026, Al Jazeera and Salon wrote that Donald Trump, despite his criticism of Bush, was using the "Iraq playbook" to justify America and Israel going to war against Iran; the U.S. claimed to be targeting Iran's nuclear weapons program.

== See also ==
- Curveball (informant) - False informant about Iraqi WMD
- Disarmament of Libya
