= Free Iraqi Forces =

Militia who served in the 2003 invasion of Iraq

Free Iraqi Forces (FIF)
- Flag of the Free Iraqi Forces (FIF), seen on Free Iraqi Forces militiamen’s uniform as a flag sleeve patch, and sometimes flown during the invasion of Iraq.
- Supreme Commander: Aras Habib
- Dates active: 1991–2005
- Allegiance: Iraq
- Headquarters: Baghdad, Iraq
- Active regions: Iraq
- Ideology: Anti-Saddamism; Democracy; Factions: Nationalism; Secularism; Islamism; Conservatism; Federalism; Monarchism; Liberalism
- Size: 500 (peak)
- Wars: Iraq War: 2003 invasion of Iraq

The Free Iraqi Forces (FIF) was a militia made up of Iraqi expatriates, who served in the 2003 United States invasion of Iraq and its aftermath, under the control of Ahmed Chalabi's Iraqi National Congress government-in-exile. The paramilitary branch of the program was also known as the Free Iraqi Fighting Forces (FIFF), while other elements served as interpreters or on civil affairs projects.

== Composition ==
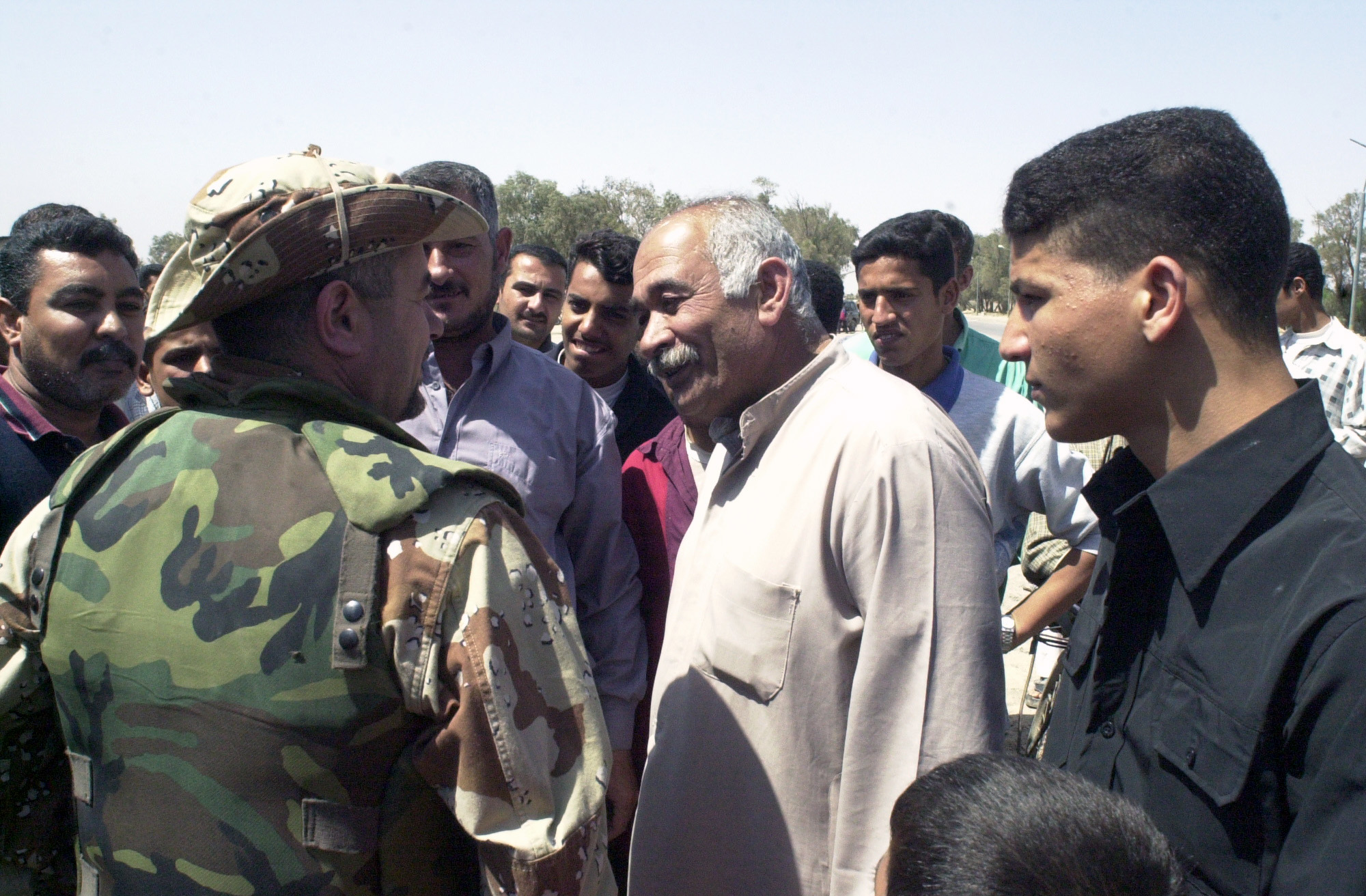
An FIF soldier in an American camouflage uniform

The original intent of the American Office of the Secretary of Defense was to recruit and train 3,000 Iraqi expatriates in Taszar, Hungary in preparation for the war. Recruitment, however, fell well below the target number, and were of dubious military utility, ranging from ages 18 to 55.

== Operations ==
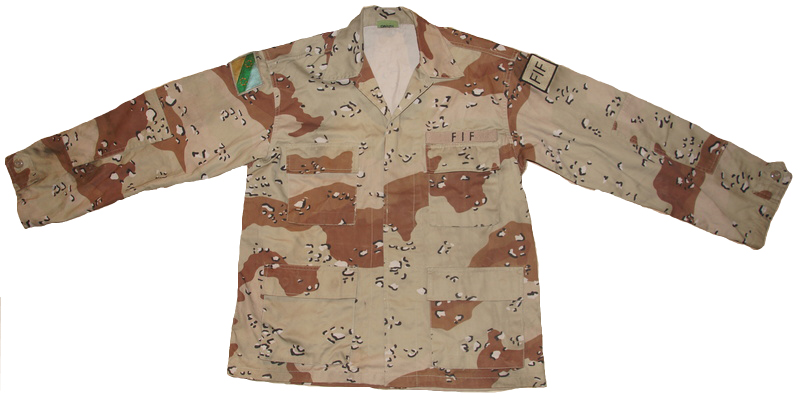
Free Iraqi Forces (FIF) desert battle dress uniform with insignia (Private collection of P-E / Militariabelgium)

The program was seen as unsuccessful, with at one point some US$63 million spent to recruit and train 69 troops for the FIF, and the program was dissolved in April 2003. The FIFF never numbered more than 500 troops. The units were also seen as undisciplined and pro-Shia and anti-Sunni, and engaged in looting.
