= Bill Murray (CIA officer) =

CIA officer

William D. Murray
- Born: Massachusetts

William D. Murray is an American Central Intelligence Agency (CIA) officer. Murray retired in March 2005, after a career of 40 years of military and civilian government service. During his 36 years with CIA, Murray rose from entry level to the highest levels of the Senior Executive Service and managed field operations in a number of overseas locations, frequently in times of war and civil strife. He also managed several different Washington based units at varying times and at increasing levels of complexity. The main thrust of his career was in the Middle East but he also served as the organization's field manager for operations in the Balkans and later as the senior officer commanding one of the largest and most important offices in Paris.

Murray was an outspoken critic within the CIA of the intelligence used by the Bush administration to justify the 2003 invasion of Iraq.

In the final stages of his active service he was seconded to the U.S. Senate to assist in creating the Intelligence Reform and Terrorism Prevention Act which made the largest change in U.S. government structures since the end of the Second World War. He received several awards over the years culminating with the Distinguished Career Intelligence Medal.

As of early 2009, Murray continued to work as a consultant with other former CIA officials from the company he started in 2006, Alphom Group, LLC.

== See also ==
- Tyler Drumheller
