= Kategate =

2024 scandal concerning doctored photo

The photograph at the centre of the controversy

Kategate or Photogate refers to the scandal involving the release of a photograph of Catherine, Princess of Wales, and her three children on Mother's Day in 2024. The photograph was later revealed to be photo doctored allegedly by the Princess. The public absence of Catherine following an abdominal surgery in mid-January had received extensive international media coverage in early 2024.

On 10 March, on the occasion of Mother's Day in the United Kingdom, Catherine released an edited photograph of herself with her children, which was withdrawn by several major agencies after the editing inconsistencies were noticed. The following day Catherine admitted to having personally edited the photograph, and apologised for any confusion. The photograph was noted, by newspaper commentators, as being the catalyst for a surge in coverage and speculation. The photograph and the preceding absence became the primary news item of some major outlets, leading it to dominate global trends on social media platforms, with viewers of BBC News accusing their coverage as being excessive and sensationalist.

== Background ==
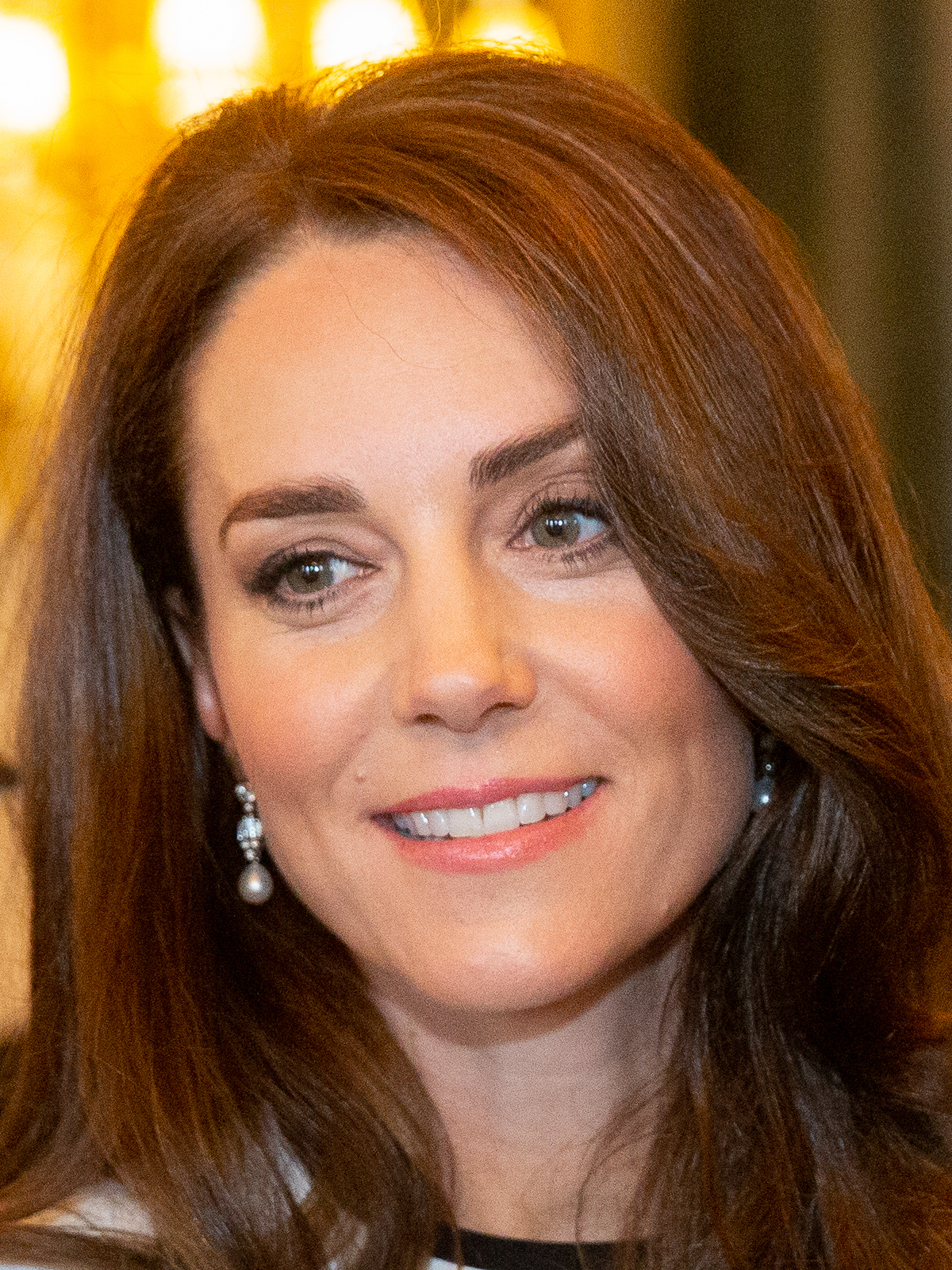
Catherine, Princess of Wales, in 2023

Kensington Palace issued a statement on 17 January 2024 saying that Catherine, Princess of Wales, had undergone "planned abdominal surgery" at The London Clinic the previous day, and would remain in hospital for up to two weeks. The statement said that she was "unlikely to return to public duties until after Easter", and that Catherine wished the details of her health circumstances to remain undisclosed. Kensington Palace said that Catherine's condition at the time was not cancer-related.

Catherine returned to Adelaide Cottage, the Waleses' family home in Windsor Home Park, on 29 January, thirteen nights after her surgery. A spokesperson said that she was "making good progress". Kensington Palace said that it would provide only significant updates on Catherine's recovery. While Kensington Palace's initial statement said that Catherine would not return to official duties until after Easter (31 March), commentators suggested that her return could be postponed for a few weeks due to the school holidays of her children.

Even before Catherine's hospitalisation, her public absence since Christmas Day led to speculation about her health. While the frankness in revealing her planned operation was considered unusual, following her hospitalisation, speculation grew on social media and the national press about the nature of her treatment.

== Mother's Day photograph ==
=== Publication ===
On 10 March, on the occasion of Mother's Day in the United Kingdom, the Waleses' social media accounts released a photograph of Catherine seated on a chair and surrounded by her children. The text accompanying the post, signed by Catherine, thanked all of the well-wishers for their continued support, and wished everyone a happy Mother's Day. It was the first official photograph of Catherine to be released since Christmas Day, and featured on the front pages of newspapers and online news sites.

The metadata of the image indicated that a Canon 5D Mark IV digital camera with a Canon 50 mm (2.0 in) lens was used in its production. Kensington Palace stated that the photograph was taken in 2024 by William. It was not unusual for the family to publish photographs taken by family members rather than professional photographs, beginning with the first official photograph of the newborn Prince George, which was taken by Michael Middleton, Catherine's father. The photograph was distributed by PA Media to other British news outlets under embargo.

=== Withdrawal and apology ===
Later that evening, the Associated Press withdrew its publication of the picture, stating that "the source has manipulated the image". Other agencies followed suit with kill-notices, including Reuters, Agence France-Presse, Getty Images, and European Pressphoto Agency. PA Media said it had contacted Kensington Palace about the concerns, but would not withdraw the image. After no such clarification was received, it also withdrew the image. The debacle featured on the front pages of major British tabloids and newspapers on 11 March, including The Sun, Daily Telegraph, Daily Mirror, and Metro. Several commentators and media outlets referred to the photograph controversy as "Kategate".

A social media post signed by Catherine on 11 March said that, being an amateur photographer, she occasionally experimented with editing, and apologised "for any confusion". Kensington Palace said it would not publish the unedited photograph. Royal sources said that it was not intended as a professional photograph, suggesting that the edits were minor.

It was later confirmed that a published 2022 photo of Queen Elizabeth with many of her grandchildren and great-grandchildren, described as having been taken by Catherine at Balmoral, showed signs of having been altered after allegations were made that it was a composite of several different images. The Observer's picture desk analysed and confirmed evidence of manipulation in that royal photograph, and published magnifications of areas in the image that showed anomalies.

Catherine has been patron of the Royal Photographic Society since June 2019, and previously described herself as an "enthusiastic amateur photographer".

== Analysis and reaction ==
According to Hany Farid, a professor specialising in image analysis, the anomalies could be explained by poor manual image editing, poor camera processing, or a poor composite of images taken in rapid succession. Several specialists in photographic editing commented that the image had clearly been doctored in an amateur way. An analysis of the metadata of the image, distributed by PA Media, suggested that it was saved twice on Adobe Photoshop using an Apple Mac computer, though it was not clear if it was on the same device. The initial image was taken at an aperture of f/3.2, with a shutter speed of 1/125, giving a moderately shallow depth of field. Therefore, according to an analysis by The Guardian, multiple frames were likely used to composite a sharper result. Knowing where the initial photograph should be out of focus enabled staff at the newspaper to identify 20 anomalies in the distributed photo.

The photograph has been described as the apex of growing speculation and the catalyst for it being reported by mainstream news outlets. The royal biographer Hugo Vickers commented that rather than reassuring the public, the debacle had "completely done the opposite". The royal family expert Richard Fitzwilliams also shared the same view, and called the debacle "a cack-handed PR job rather than anything particularly sinister". Mark Borkowski, a public relations expert, said that the palace should publish the unedited photograph to quash rumours, a call echoed by the British Press Photographers' Association.

For several commentators, the controversy raised questions about trust in the royal family and its transparency, with relevant concerns for debates on misinformation. On 14 March, Phil Chetwynd, AFP's global news director, said that the controversy had raised "major issues" for the agency's relationship with Kensington Palace, whose future output would be reviewed rigorously before publication. Chetwynd said that the palace was "absolutely not" a trusted source, and that the kill notices issued were more typical for photographs from the state news agencies of North Korea and Iran.

== See also ==
- List of -gate scandals and controversies
