= Rendon Group =

American public relations firm

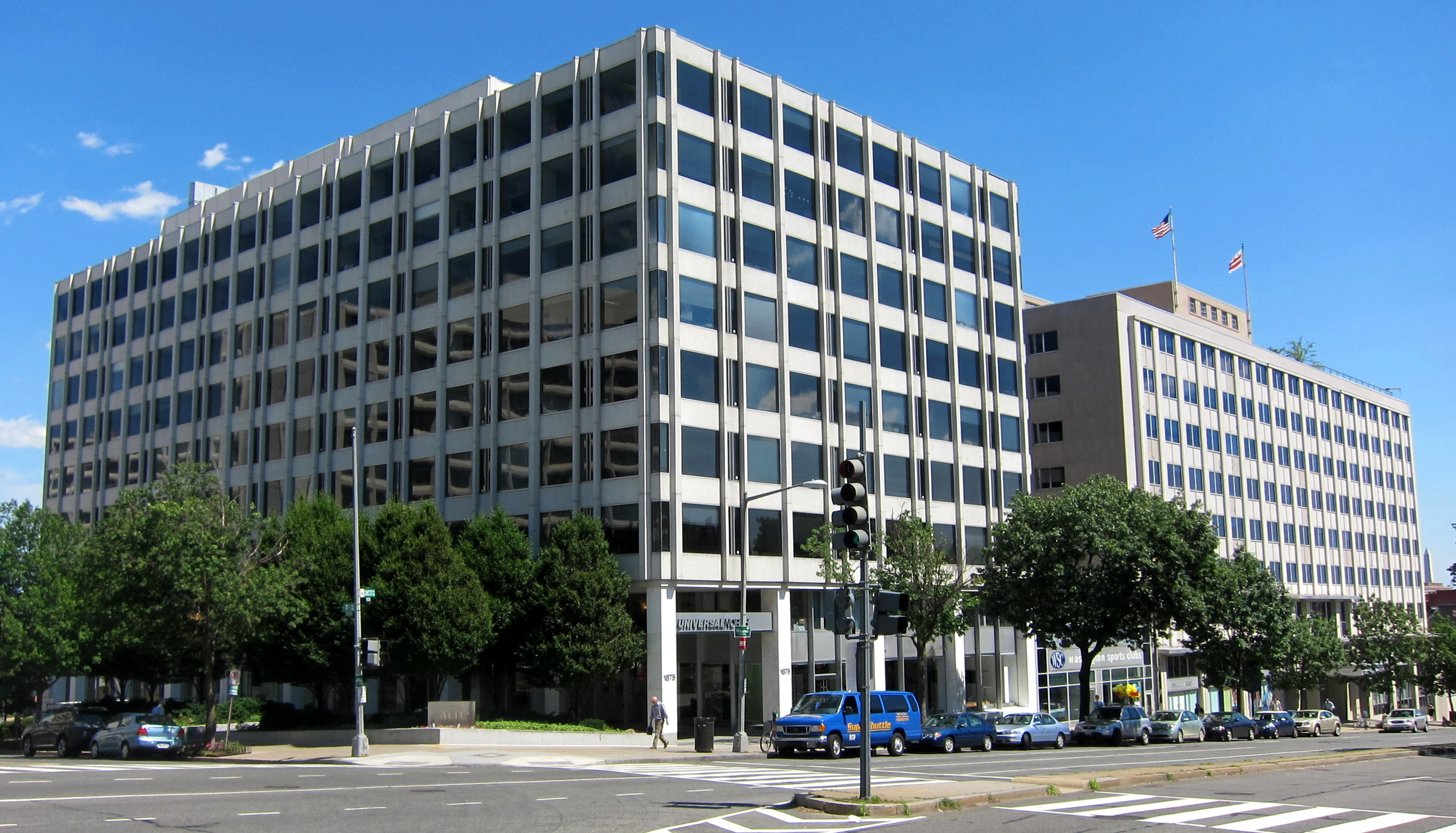
The Universal North Building (foreground) in Washington, D.C., and Rendon Group headquarters.

The Rendon Group is a public relations firm headed by John Rendon.

== History ==
=== John Rendon ===
John Rendon began his career in Democratic Party politics with George McGovern's 1972 presidential campaign. He later served as the Executive Director and Political Director of the Democratic National Committee; managed President Carter's 1980 Democratic convention in New York; and subsequently worked as Director of Scheduling and Advance for President Carter's reelection campaign. In 1985, Rendon began working for clients internationally. The company was founded in 1981 and offers consulting and training in Strategic Communications, Crisis Communications, Public Affairs, Political Consulting, Media Monitoring and Analysis, Media Training, Media Relations, Opinion Polling, Social Media, and New Business Risk Analysis. According to the Rendon Group website, the company has worked in over 98 countries to date.

=== Iraq ===
A number of publications have reported on The Rendon Group's work with the CIA in the 1990s. After allegation of inflated staff salaries, the CIA conducted an audit in 1995. ABC reported that the company spent $23 million in the first year of work. The CIA has not commented as to whether the claims were accurate.

According to a freelance translator who helped translate some of the radio broadcasts into Arabic, the program was poorly run. "No one in-house spoke a word of Arabic," he says. The scripts, he adds, were often ill-conceived. "Who in Iraq is going to think it's funny to poke fun at Saddam's mustache," the student notes, "when the vast majority of Iraqi men themselves have mustaches?"

Writing in the New Yorker, Seymour Hersh said the Rendon Group was "paid close to a hundred million dollars by the CIA" for its work with the INC. Journalist James Bamford reported in the Rolling Stone that Rendon came up with the name for the INC and helped install Ahmed Chalabi as its head. Francis Brooke, adviser to Ahmed Chalabi and former employee of The Rendon Group said, “Those arguments are false. Mr. Rendon was a consultant. The Iraqi National Congress was founded independently by Dr. Chalabi, and Mr. Rendon provided consulting services during that period.”

The Rendon Group replied on its website to Mr. Bamford's article, saying, “For the record, the Rendon Group (TRG) had no role whatsoever in making the case for the Iraq war, here at home or internationally. Mr. Bamford's contention to the contrary is flatly untrue. TRG reviews open source media reports for the Department of Defense and analyzes and charts positive and negative trends very much the same way public opinion researchers analyze polling data. Unable to find facts that support his thesis, Mr. Bamford relies on false information and mischaracterization to create his story.” The post goes on to address numerous factual errors in Bamford's article.

=== OSI ===
The Office of Strategic Influence, or OSI, was a department created by the United States Department of Defense on October 30, 2001. According to a DOD IG Report, The Rendon Group never had any connection to OSI aside from a 60-day deployment. In February 2002, OSI provided a government contracting technical representative to assist in managing a work order given to The Rendon Group that was funded by the Office of the Assistant Secretary of Defense for Command, Control, Communications and Intelligence for the Joint Information Operation Task Force. This Task Order funded a 60-day deployment of two media advisors to Indonesia to support the embassy's public diplomacy and opinion research. Later, DOD publicly disbanded the OSI following a backlash when Pentagon officials said the new office would engage in "black" disinformation campaigns, of which The Rendon Group was not a part.

=== Afghanistan ===
In December, 2005, the Chicago Tribune reported that the Rendon Group received $1.4 million in 2004 to help the Afghan government with media relations. According to the paper, President Karzai and Zalmay Khalilzad, then the U.S. ambassador to Afghanistan, were unhappy with the work. The article quoted Jeff Raleigh, who helped oversee Rendon in Kabul for the U.S. Embassy and later left the U.S. Embassy in September, as saying the contract was "a rip-off of the U.S. taxpayer". Later Jeff Raleigh's Afghan supervisor said Jeff wanted full control of The Rendon Group and was out of his bound. Furthermore, the same official, Ambassador Daod, in a signed letter said that The Rendon Group did a great job and really helped his office. Former Pentagon spokesman Richard McGraw said, "I think they did an excellent job in a tough circumstance." The company continued its working relationship with the Pentagon, who funded an additional $3.9 million project to create a media team for anti-narcotics programs. Advocates say Rendon helps fight propaganda from Islamic fundamentalists and strategize messaging for their clients. Critics say the Pentagon's use of media firms such as Rendon blurs the line between public relations and propaganda.

In late August 2009 Stars and Stripes reported that the Rendon Group was employed by US Forces in Afghanistan to provide “news analysis and media assessment”, including profiling journalists writing on the war. Stars and Stripes alleged that one of their reporters had been denied embedding access for refusing to highlight positive coverage. According to Air Force Capt. Elizabeth Mathias, a public affairs officer with U.S. Forces Afghanistan in Kabul, the reports were designed so that, “We know with whom we’re working.” She said that [DOD] had not “denied access to anyone because of what may or may not come out of their biography.” However DOD has moved from a “positive”, “neutral”, “negative” scale to one of accuracy. The work was allegedly intended to analyze how effectively the military is communicating its message and familiarize US Forces with the journalists covering the war, these claims however seem to be contradicted by the actual profiles (which Stars and Stripes obtained physical copies of) which included no mention on accuracy but instead were not only focused on if journalist past work could be said to be positive, neutral or negative, but also included ways in which these journalist could be manipulated to produce positive spin. This manipulation was paid for by taxpayers.
