= Petra Bank =

Former Jordanian bank

Petra Bank was a Jordanian bank. It began in 1977 when Prince Hassan bin Talal, the Crown Prince of Jordan approached Ahmad Chalabi, an Iraqi economist while the latter was teaching at the American University of Beirut to launch a new Jordanian bank, and wanted Chalabi to help him form and run the venture. By 1978, Petra Bank was incorporated and running for business in Amman and throughout Jordan. The Crown Prince's support also enabled Petra to open a string of branches for the first time in the West Bank (not a financial institution). Members of Chalabi's family also ran an investment company, Socofi, in Geneva, another bank, MEBCO, in Geneva and Beirut, as well as a Washington arm of Petra Bank known as Petra International.

Petra Bank became the third largest bank in Jordan. But when the Central Bank of Jordan, through a decree issued by its governor Mohammed Said Nabulsi imposed tough liquidity ratios on Jordanian banks to reduce the outflow of foreign exchange from Jordan, forcing banks to deposit 30% of their foreign holdings as reserves at the Central Bank, Petra Bank became the only Jordanian bank that could not comply with the liquidity ratios imposed. An investigation was launched which led to accusations of embezzlement and false accounting by the bank. Many of the bank's bad loans were to Chalabi-linked companies. The Swiss and Lebanese firms, Mebco and Socofi, were subsequently put into liquidation too.

Petra Bank collapsed on August 2, 1989 and was put under government supervision and an audit was imposed on the bank's books. Two weeks later, Ahmed Chalabi fled Jordan through the help of Prince Hassan bin Talal. The audit investigation subsequently uncovered further evidence of massive fraud committed by the bank. A $350 million bail-out was announced by the Central Bank of Jordan to pay out to depositors to avert a potential collapse of the country's entire banking system. According to an Arthur Anderson audit report, there was $80 million in bad loans at Petra Bank, $20 million lost to "unsupported foreign currency balances at counter-party banks" and another $60 million that could simply not be found. The affair cost Jordan around $200 million in losses. The Jordanian attorney-general charged that Ahmed Chalabi was directly responsible for the collapse of Petra Bank. Chalabi was convicted and sentenced in absentia for bank fraud by a Jordanian military tribunal to 22 years in prison on 31 charges of embezzlement, theft, misuse of depositor funds and currency speculation. Chalabi maintained that his prosecution was a politically motivated effort to discredit him. Chalabi never served the sentence dying on 3 November 2015 from a heart attack.
