= Aras Habib =

Iraqi businessman, politician and colonel

- Born: August 6, 1967 (age 59); Baghdad, First Republic of Iraq
- Military career
- Allegiance: Iraqi National Congress: Free Iraqi Forces
- Rank: Commander
- Conflicts: 2003 invasion of Iraq

Aras Habib Mohammad Karim al-Fayli (Arabic: آراس حبيب محمد كريم الفيلي) is an Iraqi politician, businessman, financier, and former militant leader of Kurdish origin, who was also a Feyli Kurdish community leader. He was close with Ahmed Chalabi and joined the Iraqi National Congress (INC) when it was founded in 1992, becoming its leader in 2015. He was one of the most prominent advocates for the 2003 invasion of Iraq but later fell out with US authorities who believed he was working for Iran. Aras Habib also founded and owned the Al-Bilad Islamic Bank in Iraq.

== Early life ==
Aras Habib Mohammad Karim was born on August 6, 1967, in Baghdad, and his father was Habib Mohammad Karim. He belonged to a Feyli Kurdish family long affiliated with the Kurdistan Democratic Party, and his father, Habib Muhammad Karim, served as the third secretary of the KDP. According to Kurdpress, the Kurdish news agency of the Iranian state-owned media, Habib Karim belonged to the Malekshahi tribe from Badra in Iraq, and traced his ancestry to Arkavaz in Malekshahi County in Ilam province.

After the Iraqi–Kurdish Autonomy Agreement of 1970 was signed, which required the vice-president of Iraq to be Kurdish, the KDP nominated his father Habib Karim for the position, although the Iraqi government refused to approve, accusing Habib Karim of having Iranian origins as a Feyli Kurd. This had infuriated Mustafa Barzani. Habib Karim, who served as secretary-general of the KDP in 1974-75, was also the brother-in-law of Zakiya Isma'il Haqqi, a Feyli Kurd who was the first woman to be appointed as a judge in Iraq, and was the founder and leader of the Kurdish Women's Union. Habib Karim was appointed as secretary-general of the KDP in 1964 after Barzani expelled Ibrahim Ahmad and his faction from the party. When the activities of Mustafa Barzani collapsed in March 1975, Habib Karim and Zakiya Isma'il Haqqi accepted the amnesty offered by Iraq and retired from the Kurdish movement. Habib Karim had a brother named Ja'far Karim, a medical doctor in Baghdad, who was one of the founders of the Rizgari Party, the chief predecessor of the KDP, in 1945, and was part of the first political bureau of the KDP in 1946. Ja'far Karim was considered left-leaning, while Habib Karim was considered non-ideological.

== Career ==
Shortly after founding the Iraqi National Congress in 1992, Ahmed Chalabi, with CIA support, held a conference in Vienna, Austria, aiming to unite the Iraqi opposition against Saddam Hussein. In fall of 1992, Ahmed Chalabi was pushing for a wider conference held in Iraqi Kurdistan, under control of the Kurdish rebels. Ahmed Chalabi had earlier met Mustafa Barzani in the 1960s. Later, Mustafa Barzani introduced Ahmed Chalabi to Aras Habib Karim, who was young and educated, speaking Kurdish, Arabic, Persian, and English. He also allegedly received training in Israel. According to Ahmed Chalabi, Aras Habib Karim gathered 400 cars for the conference despite being given very short notice. Over time, Aras Habib grew closer to Chalabi and became his head of operations, intelligence, security, and finances. In October, they held the conference in Kurdistan, and Chalabi assembled a team consisting of Aras Habib Karim, Nabil Musawi, Francis Brooke, and Zaab Sethna, who were a Feyli Kurd, a Shia Arab, an American Christian, and a Zoroastrian respectively. During the Iraqi Kurdish Civil War, when KDP leader Masoud Barzani invited the Iraqi army to expel the PUK from Erbil, the Iraqi troops took the chance to raid the INC headquarters, while double agents within the INC helped execute over 100 members, although most escaped, including Aras Habib Karim, who fled to Turkey. During the raid, Iraqi troops burst into the room where Aras Habib hid behind the door and pointed a revolver to his chin, preparing to commit suicide, although they did not detect him and he narrowly escaped with his life.

Aras Habib Karim was also the director of the "Information Collection Program" in the INC, through which Chalabi had filtered much of the propaganda lobbying for the invasion of Iraq. According to many INC defectors and even ordinary Iraqis, despite Ahmed Chalabi being portrayed as the leader of the INC, it was really Aras Habib Karim who operated it. Aras Habib Karim was also accused of having been the one who first introduced Sabah Khodada to foreign journalists. Aras Habib Karim was a particular concern for the CIA when they were supporting Ahmed Chalabi and the INC. The CIA and MI6 believed Aras Habib Karim to be an Iranian MOIS agent, and they had told Stephen Cambone, although senior Bush administration officials rejected the possibility. Aras Habib Karim also had a cousin named Ali Yassin Karim, who worked as a medic for the CIA, and was threatened with dismissal, but was retained after the intervention of James Woolsey.

After the 2003 invasion of Iraq, Aras Habib Karim served as the director of intelligence for the Iraqi Ministry of Interior, and later as an under-secretary. After 2003, Aras Habib Karim became notorious in Iraq, and it was well known in Baghdad that he and his men used seized Ba'athist documents to track former high-ranking Ba'athists, killing many of them. During the 2004 Iraq spring fighting, Ahmed Chalabi was accused of disrupting US intelligence activities by providing Iran with future US plans in Iraq, and the intercepts of the NSA reportedly found that Aras Habib Karim was paid by Iranian intelligence, among several more accusations. On May 20, 2004, the US Army raided Chalabi's home and INC offices throughout Baghdad, although Chalabi was not arrested. In the United States, an investigation was launched into whether Iran manipulated the US into invading Iraq by passing on false intelligence through the INC.

During the raids on Chalabi, one of the arrest warrants was for Aras Habib Karim, although he had vanished around the same time. Aras Habib Karim went into hiding. A few days after the raid, Ahmed Chalabi accused the CIA Director George Tenet of having ruined his relationship with the Bush administration by making false allegations against him, and claimed that even Aras Habib Karim previously had problems with Tenet. Ahmed Chalabi also firmly defended Aras Habib Karim against the accusations against him. Although Aras Habib Karim was a target of the raids in 2004, the US eventually lost interest in him, and he was still active a year later.

Aras Habib became leader of the INC after the death of Ahmed Chalabi in 2015, becoming the first Feyli Kurd to lead a major political party in Iraq. He had an intense rivalry with Tamara Chalabi, the daughter of Ahmed Chalabi, but nevertheless emerged as the leader of the party. He also established the Aras Habib Youth Development Foundation in 2015, and became the chairman of al-Bilad Islamic Bank. In 2018, Aras Habib Karim was blacklisted by the US Treasury, which accused him of smuggling money to Iranian-backed Iraqi militias and transferring funds from the IRGC Quds Force to Hezbollah in Lebanon through the Iraqi banking sector. The US accused Aras Habib Karim of having ties to Valiollah Seif, the governor of the Central Bank of Iran, as well as Mohammad Ibrahim Bazzi, a Lebanese Hezbollah financier, who had connections to the Central Bank of Iran through Abdallah Safi-al-Din, a cousin of Hassan Nasrallah. The US nicknamed the relationship as "the Bazzi Network". After the US sanctions, the Central Bank of Iraq ordered all financial institutions in the country to avoid Aras Habib Karim and Al-Bilad Islamic Bank. Aras Habib Karim denied the allegations of the US Treasury, claiming that they were politically motivated, and also claimed that he submitted evidence for his innocence to the Central Bank of Iraq, which he claimed was the only financial authority over him.

His father died on July 31, 2013. A commemoration ceremony was held for Habib Karim on October 13, 2017, at "Ansar-ol-Hossein", a Husayniyya in Tehran. At the ceremony, Habib Karim was described as the leader of the Feyli Kurds in Iraq, and Aras Habib Karim was declared as his successor. During the 2018 Iraqi parliamentary election, he supported the Victory Alliance led by Haider al-Abadi. In 2020, on the anniversary of the KDP, Aras Habib Karim praised the KDP for their efforts in defending the Kurds from previous oppressive regimes. Aras Habib Karim ran for the minority seat reserved for Feyli Kurds during the 2025 Iraqi parliamentary election.
