= Tyler Drumheller =

CIA officer and antiwar activist

- Born: Tyler Scott Drumheller; April 12, 1952; Biloxi, Mississippi
- Died: August 2, 2015 (aged 63); Falls Church, Virginia
- Burial place: Columbia Gardens Cemetery, Arlington, Virginia
- Education: University of Virginia (B.A.); Georgetown University
- Spouse: Linda Blocher
- Children: 1
- Espionage activity
- Country: United States
- Agency: Central Intelligence Agency
- Service years: 26

Tyler Scott Drumheller (April 12, 1952 – August 2, 2015) was an American Central Intelligence Agency (CIA) officer who served during the Cold War and early war on terror, advancing to chief of the European division for clandestine operations in the Directorate of Operations from 2001 until his retirement in 2005. He later became known for exposing the Bush White House's use of intelligence from Curveball, an unreliable Iraqi intelligence source managed by the German BND, to mislead policymakers and the public in the lead up to the 2003 invasion of Iraq.

== Early life ==
Tyler Scott Drumheller was born April 12, 1952, in Biloxi, Mississippi, to a US Air Force chaplain and his wife. Part of his childhood was spent as a military brat in Germany before attending the University of Virginia. He graduated in 1974 with a bachelors in history and attended postgraduate studies in Chinese at Georgetown University before being hired by the CIA in 1979.

Drumheller met his wife, fellow CIA officer Linda Blocher, while she was working as a secretary in the Africa division, and proposed to her in a stairwell at CIA headquarters after learning that he would soon be sent to Zambia. The two had a daughter together.

== Career ==
Drumheller claimed the CIA had credible sources discounting some weapon of mass destruction (WMD) claims made during the Iraq disarmament crisis before the 2003 Invasion of Iraq. He received and discounted documents central to the Niger yellowcake forgery prior to the 2003 invasion of Iraq. He has also stated that senior White House officials dismissed intelligence information from his agency which reported Saddam Hussein had no WMD program.

According to Drumheller the Bush administration ignored CIA advice and used whatever information it could find to justify an invasion of Iraq. The CIA, brokered by the French intelligence service, recruited Iraqi Foreign Minister Naji Sabri in Europe during the late summer of 2002. Sabri told the CIA in September that Hussein had no major active weapons of mass destruction programs, had no fissile material and that biological weapons were almost non-existent, although he claimed that there were chemical weapons. This information was then transmitted to the White House, but it was ignored in favor of the information acquired by Germany's intelligence service, the Bundesnachrichtendienst (BND) coming from a source known as Curveball.

On September 6, 2007, Sidney Blumenthal, reporting at Salon.com, supported Drumheller's account: "Now two former senior CIA officers have confirmed Drumheller's account to me and provided the background to the story of how the information that might have stopped the invasion of Iraq was twisted in order to justify it." In March 2011, Blumenthal sent an email which included "apparently highly sensitive information" to then U.S. Secretary of State Hillary Clinton with details received from Drumheller, who had spoken with a CIA colleague, mentioning the name of an intelligence source.

Drumheller retired from the CIA in 2005 after a 26-year career, where he spent more than 25 years as an intelligence operative.

== Retirement ==
After retiring, Drumheller wrote On the Brink: An Insider’s Account of How the White House Compromised American Intelligence, with Elaine Monaghan, published by Carroll and Graf in 2006 (ISBN 978-0786719150).

== Death ==
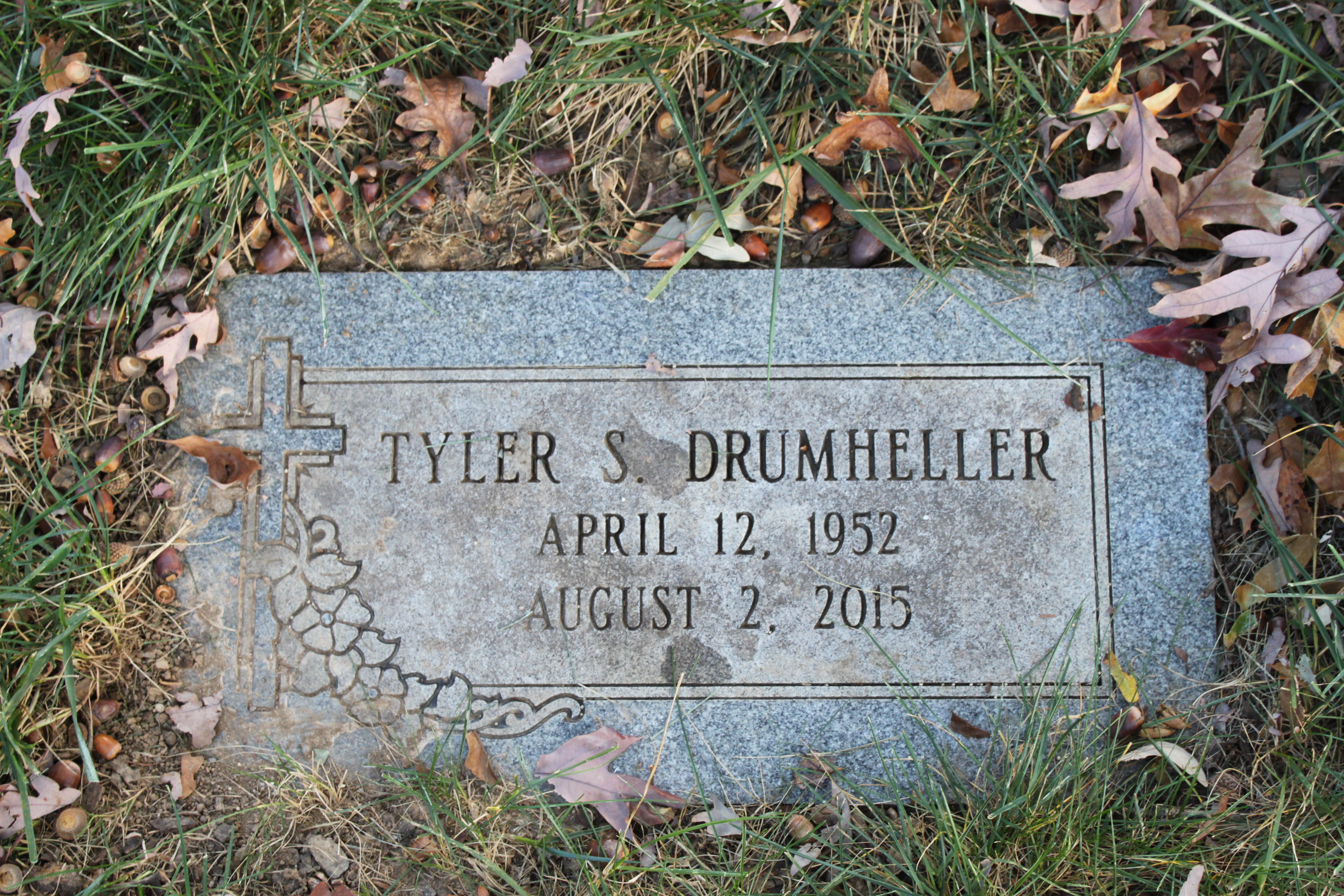
Grave of Drumheller in Columbia Gardens Cemetery

Drumheller died on August 2, 2015, from pancreatic cancer at the age of 63 in Falls Church, Virginia. He is buried at Columbia Gardens Cemetery in Arlington, Virginia.

== See also ==
William D. Murray

== Bibliography ==
- On the Brink : An Insider's Account of How the White House Compromised American Intelligence (Carroll & Graf, November 2006); ISBN 0-7867-1915-X
- Wie das Weiße Haus die Welt belügt: Der Insider-Bericht des ehemaligen CIA-Chefs von Europa (Hugendubel Verlag, August 2007); ISBN 3-7205-3013-2
