= Iraqi National Congress =

Iraqi National Congress المؤتمر الوطني العراقي
- Leader: Ahmed Chalabi (until 2015); Aras Habib (since 2015)
- Founded: 1992; 34 years ago
- Headquarters: Vienna, Austria (1992-2003); Baghdad, Iraq (2003-present)
- Newspaper: Al Mutamar
- Armed wing: Free Iraqi Forces (2003)
- Ideology: Iraqi nationalism Classical liberalism Economic liberalism Secularism; Conservatism; Federalism; Feyli interests (alleged, denied)
- Political position: Centre
- National affiliation: Al-Muwatin Coalition
- Seats in the Council of Representatives: 0 / 328

Party flag

Website
- Iraqi National Congress

Iraqi Government-in-exile الحكومة العراقية في المنفى (Arabic) Al-hukuma Al-‘Iraqiyya fi Al-Manfa
- 1992–2003
- Flag Emblem
- Demonym: Iraqi
- History
  - Established: 1992
  - Disestablished: 2003
- Today part of: Republic of Iraq

The Iraqi National Congress (INC; Arabic: المؤتمر الوطني العراقي, romanized: Al-Moutammar Al-Watani Al-'Iraqi) is an Iraqi political party that was led by Ahmed Chalabi until his death in 2015. It was formed as an umbrella opposition group of majority Feyli Kurds and Shia Arabs, with the aid of the United States' government following the Persian Gulf War, for the purpose of fomenting the overthrow of longtime Iraqi President Saddam Hussein. Today the party is mainly run by Feyli Kurds after Aras Habib was elected as the general secretary of the party in 2015. The party was mainly considered as a pro-American ally before turning its stance towards Iran in 2006 after alleged disputes with the Americans.

== History ==
==== Early History ====
INC was set up in Vienna, Austria in 1992 by Ahmad Chalabi and Aras Habib with the backing of secular Feyli dissidents largely funded by money from UAE following the Persian Gulf War to coordinate the activities of various anti-Saddam groups. Then President George H. W. Bush signed a presidential finding directing the Central Intelligence Agency to create conditions for Saddam's removal in May 1991. Coordinating anti-Saddam groups was an important element of this strategy. The name INC was reportedly coined by public relations expert John Rendon (of the Rendon Group agency) and the group was funded by the United States. The group received millions in covert funding in the 1990s, and then about $8 million a year in overt funding after the passage of the Iraq Liberation Act in 1998. The deep involvement of the American CIA in the creation and early funding of the INC in its early years led many to consider the group a "creation of the CIA" rather than an organ of genuine Iraqi opposition.

INC represented the first major attempt by opponents of Saddam to join forces, bringing together Kurds of all religions, Sunni and Shi'ite Arabs (both Islamic fundamentalist and secular) as well as non-Muslim Arabs; additionally monarchists, nationalists and ex-military officers.

In June 1992, nearly 200 delegates from dozens of opposition groups met in Vienna, along with Iraq's two main Kurdish militias, the rival Kurdistan Democratic Party (KDP) and the Patriotic Union of Kurdistan (PUK). In October 1992, major Shi'ite groups, including the SCIRI and al-Dawa, came into the coalition and INC held a pivotal meeting in Kurdish-controlled northern Iraq, choosing a Leadership Council and a 26-member executive council. The leaders included monarchist Sharif Ali bin al-Hussein that called for the return of a constitutional monarchy for Iraq, moderate Shi'ite Muslim cleric Mohammad Bahr al-Ulloum; ex-Iraqi general Hasan Naqib; and Masoud Barzani. Ahmed Chalabi, a secular Shi'ite Iraqi-American and mathematician by training, became head of the group.

INC's political platform promised "human rights and rule of law within a constitutional, democratic, and pluralistic Iraq"; preservation of Iraq's territorial integrity, and complete compliance with international law, including United Nations resolutions relating to Iraq.

Differences within INC eventually led to its virtual collapse. In May 1994, the two main Kurdish parties began fighting with each other over territory and other issues. As a result of the growing difficulties within INC, the United States began seeking out other opponents who could threaten the Iraqi regime, such as the Iraqi National Accord (INA), headed by Ayad Allawi. The rivalries between the Kurdish parties prompted the KDP to seek armed support from Saddam Hussein for its capture of the town of Arbil from rival PUK. Iraq took advantage of the request by launching a military strike in which 200 opposition members were executed and as many as 2,000 arrested. 650 oppositionists (mostly INC) were evacuated and resettled in the United States under parole authority of the US Attorney General. INC played a central role in the truce negotiations between KDP and PUK.

INC was subsequently plagued by dissociation of many of its constituent groups from the INC umbrella, a cutoff of funds from its international backers (including the United States), and continued pressure from Iraqi intelligence services especially after a failed 1995 coup attempt. In 1998, however, the US Congress authorized $97 million in U.S. military aid for Iraqi opposition via the Iraq Liberation Act, intended primarily for INC.

==== In the lead up to the Invasion of Iraq ====
In March 2002, Seymour Hersh reported in The New Yorker that "exile groups supported by the INC have been conducting sabotage operations inside Iraq, targeting oil refineries and other installations. The latest attack took place on January 23rd, an INC official told me, when missiles fired by what he termed 'indigenous dissidents' struck the large Baiji refinery complex, north of Baghdad, triggering a fire that blazed for more than twelve hours." However, Hersh added, "A dispute over Chalabi's potential usefulness preoccupies the bureaucracy, as the civilian leadership in The Pentagon continues to insist that only the INC can lead the opposition. At the same time, a former Administration official told me, 'Everybody but the Pentagon and the office of the Vice President wants to ditch the INC.' INC's critics note that Chalabi, despite years of effort and millions of dollars in American aid, is intensely unpopular today among many elements in Iraq. 'If Chalabi is the guy, there could be a civil war after Saddam's overthrow,' one former C.I.A. operative told me. A former high-level Pentagon official added, 'There are some things that a President can't order up, and an internal opposition is one.'"

Notwithstanding these concerns, Hersh reported that "INC supporters in and around the Administration, including Paul Wolfowitz and Richard Perle, believe, like Chalabi, that any show of force would immediately trigger a revolt against Saddam within Iraq, and that it would quickly expand." In December 2002, Robert Dreyfuss reported that the administration of George W. Bush actually preferred INC-supplied analyses of Iraq over analyses provided by long-standing analysts within the CIA. "Even as it prepares for war against Iraq, the Pentagon is already engaged on a second front: its war against the Central Intelligence Agency.," he wrote. "The Pentagon is bringing relentless pressure to bear on the agency to produce intelligence reports more supportive of war with Iraq. ... Morale inside the U.S. national-security apparatus is said to be low, with career staffers feeling intimidated and pressured to justify the push for war." Much of the pro-war faction's information came from INC, even though "most Iraq hands with long experience in dealing with that country's tumultuous politics consider the INC's intelligence-gathering abilities to be nearly nil. ... The Pentagon's critics are appalled that intelligence provided by the INC might shape U.S. decisions about going to war against Baghdad. At the CIA and at the State Department, Ahmed Chalabi, the INC's leader, is viewed as the ineffectual head of a self-inflated and corrupt organization skilled at lobbying and public relations, but not much else."

"The [INC's] intelligence isn't reliable at all," said Vincent Cannistraro, a former senior CIA official and counterterrorism expert. "Much of it is propaganda. Much of it is telling the Defense Department what they want to hear. And much of it is used to support Chalabi's own presidential ambitions. They make no distinction between intelligence and propaganda, using alleged informants and defectors who say what Chalabi wants them to say, [creating] cooked information that goes right into presidential and vice-presidential speeches." (Dreyfuss, December 2002). Chalabi received training in television presentation techniques from the Irish scriptwriter Eoghan Harris prior to the invasion of Iraq.

In February 2003, as the Bush administration neared the end of its preparations for war, an internal fight erupted over INC's plan to actually become the government of Iraq after the U.S. invasion. Chalabi wanted to "declare a provisional government when the war starts," a plan that "alienated some of Mr. Chalabi's most enthusiastic backers in the Pentagon and in Congress, who fear the announcement of a provisional government made up of exiles would split anti-Saddam sentiment inside Iraq."

==== 2003-2005 ====
During the Iraq War, the United States created the Free Iraqi Forces, a militia made of Iraqi expatriates and under the control of the Iraqi National Congress, fought alongside American forces. The INC's forces were reportedly ill-equipped, often engaged in lawless activities, and also engaged in sectarian activity against Sunni Muslims.

After the first phase of the Iraq War was over and the Ba'athist government of Iraq was overthrown, a governing council, including Chalabi was set up, but when it came time to choose an interim Prime Minister Ayad Allawi, head of rival Iraqi National Accord, was chosen.

In May 2004, the United States military raided the residences of Iraqi National Congress members now living in Iraq. It had been announced on May 18 that the Pentagon had stopped sending funding to INC, which had averaged about $340,000 per month for intelligence gathered by the organization. It is unclear what the military forces were seeking, although a spokesman for Ahmed Chalabi said Chalabi had been held at gunpoint and told to accept concessions then being put in place by the United States in preparation for a transfer of sovereignty on June 30, 2004. Chalabi had been a critic of the transfer, saying that the U.S. retained too much power.

In the lead up to the January 2005 Iraqi election INC joined the United Iraqi Alliance coalition of mainly Shi'ite groups as Chalabi reinvented himself as a sharp critic of the occupation, aligning himself with Muqtada al-Sadr. Chalabi was appointed as Deputy Prime Minister in the transitional government, and INC member Ali Allawi (the cousin of Ayad Allawi, and incidentally nephew of Chalabi) became Minister of Finance.

In preparation for the December 2005 Iraqi election, INC broke with the United Iraqi Alliance and formed its own multi-ethnic coalition, the National Congress Coalition. It did not win any seats in the election.

=== Post-2005 Decline and Leadership Transition ===
The INC's failure to win any seats in the 2005 election marked the beginning of the party's decline, though Chalabi remained a prominent political figure, holding several political positions and even considered for prime minister position in 2014. However, Chalabi and the INC ties to Iran led to a falling out with the leadership in the US government. A 2006 Senate Intelligence Committee report accused sources affiliated with the INC of providing “false information” that influenced the committees assessments on Iraq leading up to the war.

Chalabi passed away in 2015 of a heart attack, he was succeeded by Aras Habib.

== Timelines ==
- Ahmed Chalabi and the Iraqi National Congress timeline posted at the Center for Cooperative Research's website
- Iraqi National Congress timeline at the Stakeholder website (operated by the Democratic Congressional Campaign Committee)
