= Allegations of Iraqi mobile weapons laboratories =

Allegation against Iraq in the lead-up to the 2003 invasion

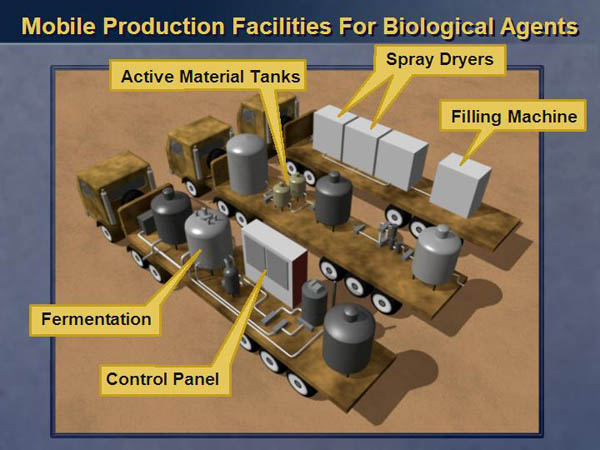
Purported Iraqi mobile weapons laboratories, actually for production of hydrogen to fill wind-sensing balloons.

During the lead-up to the Iraq War, the United States had alleged that Iraq owned bioreactors, and other processing equipment to manufacture and process biological weapons that can be moved from location to location either by train or vehicle. Subsequent investigations failed to find any evidence of Iraq having access to a mobile weapons lab.

In the run up to the 2003 Invasion of Iraq, the main rationale for the Iraq War were allegations that Iraq had failed to transparently and verifiably cease their weapons of mass destruction (WMD) program. In February 2003, Secretary of State Colin Powell gave a presentation before the United Nations showing a computer image of what were purported to be mobile weapons for creating biological agents. He said Iraq had as many as 18 mobile facilities for making anthrax and botulinum toxin, stating "they can produce enough dry, biological agent in a single month to kill thousands upon thousands of people." Powell based the assertion on accounts of at least four Iraqi defectors, including a chemical engineer who supervised one of the facilities and been present during production runs of a biological agent. Following the invasion of Iraq two trailers were found and initially described as the alleged mobile labs.

== Intelligence sources ==
In the CIA briefing days before the 2003 United Nations security council presentation Colin Powell knew that all information included in the report had to be solid. "Powell and I were both suspicious because there were no pictures of the mobile labs," Wilkerson, Powell's chief of staff said. Powell demanded multiple sources and the two CIA men present George Tenet, then the CIA director and John E. McLaughlin, then the CIA deputy director claimed to have multiple eye witness accounts and supporting evidence. Wilkerson claims that the two said, "This is it, Mr. Secretary. You can't doubt this one"

The information behind the mobile vehicles had come from the multiple informants but the main and most important one was known as Curveball, an Iraqi refugee in Germany. He claimed that after he had graduated at the top of his chemical engineering class at Baghdad University in 1994, he worked for "Dr. Germ," the pseudonym of British-trained microbiologist Rihab Rashid Taha. He led a team that built mobile labs to create biological WMD Curveball was never actually interviewed by American intelligence and in May 2004, over a year after the invasion of Iraq, the CIA concluded formally that Curveball's information was fabricated. Furthermore, on June 26, 2006, the Washington Post reported that "the CIA acknowledged that Curveball was a con artist who drove a taxi in Iraq and spun his engineering knowledge into a fantastic but plausible tale about secret bioweapons factories on wheels."

With information about the mobile labs the Bush administration then went and asked Ahmed Chalabi's Iraqi National Congress (INC) if they knew anything about this "threat". The INC provided an Iraqi defector, Mohammad Harith, who claimed that while working for the Iraqi government he had purchased seven Renault refrigerated trucks to be converted into mobile biological weapons laboratories. The INC used James Woolsey, former director of the CIA, to directly contact Deputy Assistant Defense Secretary Linton Wells, of the Defense Intelligence Agency (DIA), with info about Mohammad Harith's account to avoid any scrutiny by the CIA. Harith's was met by a DIA debriefer who concluded that it "seemed accurate, but much of it appeared embellished" and he apparently "had been coached on what information to provide." However, the line about Harith being coached was removed and one that he passed a lie detector added and as such became official evidence of mobile bio-labs even being used by Bush in his January 2003 State of the Union message. Later Mohammad Harith like curveball evidence was labeled with a fabricator notice.

A third source, reporting through Defense HUMINT channels and another asylum seeker, claimed that in June 2001 that Iraq had mobile biological weapons laboratories however after the war in Oct 2003 the source recanted his testimony.

A fourth source existed but all information and details regarding the report are still classified.

All the sources depended on the Curveball's account and were seen as supportive to it. When Tenet called Powell in late summer 2003, seven months after the U.N. speech, he admitted that all of the CIA's claims Powell used in his speech about Iraqi weapons were wrong. "They had hung on for a long time, but finally Tenet called Powell to say, 'We don't have that one, either,' " Wilkerson recalled. "The mobile labs were the last thing to go."

== Investigations ==
May 13, 2003, it was reported that a second suspected mobile weapons lab had been found in Iraq on April 19, 2003.

May 27, 2003, a fact finding mission to Iraq sent its report to Washington unanimously declaring that the trailers had nothing to do with biological weapons. The report was 'shelved'.

May 28, 2003, the Central Intelligence Agency released a report on the supposed mobile weapons labs, stating "Despite the lack of confirmatory samples, we nevertheless are confident that this trailer is a mobile BW production plant."

May 29, 2003, President George W Bush declared that they had found the weapons of mass destruction that had been claimed were in Iraq, these were in the form of mobile labs for manufacturing biological weapons.

June 2, 2003, In the UK, Susan Watts broadcasts on the influential BBC2 News Night report which includes an anonymous experts (Dr David Kelly ) opinion on the Mobile Weapons labs being for biological weapons. Dr Kelly is now only 40% certain the trailers are labs.

June 5, 2003 Dr. David Kelly one of Britains foremost experts on Biological Weapons visited Iraq to examine the trailers and take photographs.

June 7, 2003, Judith Miller reports that some scientists had doubts about the trailers in her piece – "Some experts doubt trailers were germ lab", Judith Miller and William J. Broad, New York Times.

June 8, 2003 The Observer newspaper picks up on the story with their piece "Blow to Blair over 'mobile labs' – Saddam's trucks were for balloons, not germs " Placing more pressure on Prime Minister Tony Blair over the lack of Weapons of Mass Destruction found in Iraq.

June 15, 2003, It was revealed that the trailers discovered were for the production of hydrogen to fill artillery balloons, as the Iraqis had insisted all along. The artillery balloons were used to get detailed weather data to be used to accurately direct artillery shelling.

June 20, 2003:

June 23, 2003:

July 17/18, 2003: Dr. David Kelly, a key source for many of the newspaper articles doubting the Mobile weapons labs, is found dead. An inquiry into his death, the Hutton Inquiry, found his death to be suicide.

== Powell's retraction ==
I looked at the four [sources] that [the CIA] gave me for [the mobile bio-labs], and they stood behind them, ... Now it appears not to be the case that it was that solid. At the time I was preparing the presentation, it was presented to me as being solid. April 3, 2004 I feel terrible ... [giving the speech] ... It's a blot. I'm the one who presented it on behalf of the United States to the world, and [it] will always be a part of my record. It was painful. It's painful now." 2005

— Colin L Powell

Powell retracted his

The Pentagon produced a secret report in 2003 entitled Final Technical Engineering Exploitation Report on Iraqi Suspected Biological Weapons-Associated Trailers that found that the trailers were impractical for biological agent production and almost certainly designed and built for the generation of hydrogen.

== See also ==
- Curveball (informant)
- Iraqi aluminum tubes
- Niger uranium forgeries
- Plame affair
- Ukraine bioweapons conspiracy theory
