= Ahmed Chalabi =

Iraqi politician (1945–2015)

Ahmed Chalabi أحمد الجلبي
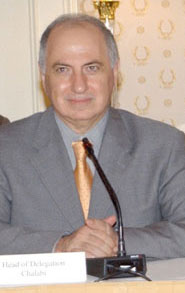
- Chalabi in 2003

Deputy Prime Minister of Iraq
- In office 1 May 2005 – 20 May 2006
- Prime Minister: Ibrahim al-Jaafari
- Preceded by: Roj Shaweis
- Succeeded by: Barham Salih

Minister of Oil
- In office 16 April 2005 – 1 January 2006
- Prime Minister: Ibrahim al-Jaafari
- Preceded by: Ibrahim Bahr al-Uloom
- Succeeded by: Hussain al-Shahristani

President of the Governing Council of Iraq
- In office 1 September 2003 – 30 September 2003
- Leader: Paul Bremer
- Preceded by: Ibrahim al-Jaafari (as prime minister)
- Succeeded by: Ayad Allawi

Personal details
- Born: Ahmed Abdel Hadi Chalabi; 30 October 1945 Kadhimiya, Kingdom of Iraq
- Died: 3 November 2015 (aged 70) Kadhimiya, Iraq
- Party: Iraqi National Congress
- Spouse: Leila Osseiran
- Children: Tamara Chalabi, Hadi Chalabi, Mariam Chalabi, Hashem Chalabi
- Parent: Abd El Hadi Chalabi (father)
- Education: Massachusetts Institute of Technology; University of Chicago

Ahmed Abdel Hadi Chalabi (Arabic: أحمد عبد الهادي الجلبي; 30 October 1945 – 3 November 2015) was an Iraqi politician and founder of the Iraqi National Congress (INC) who served as the President of the Governing Council of Iraq (37th Prime Minister of Iraq) and a Deputy Prime Minister of Iraq under Ibrahim al-Jaafari.

Chalabi was interim Minister of Oil in Iraq in April–May 2005 and December 2005 – January 2006 and Deputy Prime Minister from May 2005 to May 2006. Chalabi failed to win a seat in parliament in the December 2005 elections, and when the new Iraqi cabinet was announced in May 2006, he was not given a post. Once dubbed the "George Washington of Iraq" by American supporters, he was initially a CIA-backed operative, who later fell out of favor, with U.S. Special Forces raiding his private residence in Baghdad only one year after the invasion of Iraq. He later came under investigation by several U.S. government agencies after switching his allegiances to become an instrument of pro-Iranian influence in Iraqi politics.

In the lead-up to the 2003 invasion of Iraq, the Iraqi National Congress (INC), with the assistance of lobbying powerhouse BKSH & Associates, provided a major portion of the information on which the Office of Special Plans based its condemnation of the Iraqi President Saddam Hussein, including reports of weapons of mass destruction and alleged ties to al-Qaeda. Most, if not all, of this information has turned out to be false and Chalabi has been called a fabricator. Along with this, Chalabi also subsequently boasted, in an interview with the British Sunday Telegraph, about the impact that their faulty intelligence had on American policy. These factors led to a falling-out between him and the U.S. government. Furthermore, Chalabi was found guilty of bank fraud in the Petra Bank scandal in Jordan and he was sentenced to 22 years imprisonment in absentia.

In 2008, Office for Reconstruction and Humanitarian Assistance Director Jay Garner stated that he believed Chalabi was an Iranian agent. In January 2012, a French intelligence official stated that he believed Chalabi to be "acting on behalf of Iran".

== Early life and education ==
Chalabi was born into a prominent Arab Shia Muslim family belonging to the wealthy and influential elite of Baghdad. The Chalabi family traces its roots to the ancient Arab Tayy tribe. He was born in Kadhimiya in 1945. His family, who dated back 300 years to the Sultanate, ran Iraq's oldest commercial bank under the British-backed Kingdom of Iraq. His father, Abdel Hadi Chalabi, a wealthy grain merchant and member of the Iraqi parliament, became head of the senate when King Abdullah I of Jordan was assassinated.

His family retired from public life to a farmhouse near Baghdad when the military seized power. Chalabi left Iraq with his family in 1958, following the 14 July Revolution, and spent most of his life in the United States and the United Kingdom. He was educated at Baghdad College and Seaford College in Sussex, England before leaving for America.

In exile, following the Ba'ath party takeover, his family acted as the Iraqi Shia clergy's bankers. In the mid-1960s, he studied with cryptographer Whitfield Diffie at the Massachusetts Institute of Technology from which he received a Bachelor of Science degree in mathematics. In 1969, he earned a PhD in mathematics from the University of Chicago under the direction of George Glauberman on semisimplicity of group rings, a topic in abstract algebra. Afterwards, he took a position in the mathematics department at the American University of Beirut. He published three mathematics papers between 1973 and 1980, all in algebra.

In 1971, Chalabi married Leila Osseiran, daughter of Lebanese politician Adel Osseiran. They had four children, Tamara, Mariam, Hashem, and Hadi. Whilst still in Beirut the civil war broke out in 1975, so he moved to Jordan and found work as an interpreter.

== Business career ==
Chalabi was a bold and shrewd investor, amassing a fortune of $100 million. During his life, he was accused of corruption many times. In 1977, he founded the Petra Bank in Jordan with Crown Prince Hassan, the King's brother. In May 1989, the Governor of the Central Bank of Jordan, Mohammed Said Nabulsi, issued a decree ordering all banks in the country to deposit 35% of their reserves with the Central Bank. Petra Bank was the only bank that was unable to meet this requirement. An investigation was launched, which led to accusations of embezzlement and false accounting. The bank failed, causing a $350 million bailout by the Central Bank, after which Chalabi fled the country. It was widely reported that Chalabi escaped Jordan locked in the trunk of a car owned by Prince Hassan of Jordan. Chalabi was convicted and sentenced in absentia for bank fraud by a Jordanian military tribunal to 22 years in prison. Chalabi maintained that his prosecution was a politically motivated effort to discredit him sponsored by Saddam Hussein.

=== Exile in the UK ===
Living abroad by 1992 in London, and unable to return home for fear of his life, he set up the Iraqi National Congress (INC) with an agenda of regime change for his homeland. The organization was open to all ethnic and religious groups of Iraq, including Arabs, Kurds, Turkmen, Sunni, and Shia Muslims. Already a fluent English speaker, he turned his attention to Washington, D.C.

In 1995, after preparation and lobbying, he persuaded President Bill Clinton to fund an expedition into northern Iraq to use subterfuge to start an insurgency. Chalabi was convinced that the Iraqi military would rise up to overthrow the dictator. The commanders to whom he had spoken were the same who openly supported Saddam and crushed his opponents in the Kurdish and Shia revolts. The insurgency failed, lacking the promised ground troops, and 100 insurgents were killed by the military. The command structure of INC fell apart with factional infighting. Chalabi was banned from those frequent visits to CIA headquarters at Langley, Virginia. Nonetheless, Chalabi was doggedly determined: in 1998 Congress passed the Iraq Liberation Act, passing into American law the objective of "regime change" in Iraq.

It was reported by BBC News in May 2005 that the Jordanian government was considering whether to pardon Chalabi, in part to ease the relations between Jordan and the new Iraqi government of which Chalabi was a member. According to one report, Chalabi proposed a $32 million compensation fund for depositors affected by Petra Bank's failure. The website for Petra Bank contained a press release stating that Chalabi would refuse the pardon. Although Chalabi always maintained the case was a plot to frame him by Baghdad, the issue was revisited when the U.S. State Department raised questions about the accounting practices of the Iraqi National Congress (INC). According to The New York Times, "Chalabi insisted on a public apology, which the Jordanians refused to give."

Conservative pundit Arnaud de Borchgrave stated that following his escape from Jordan as a wanted fugitive, Chalabi established the Iraqi National Congress by sending out "scores of all-expenses-paid invitations to Iraqi exiles to a conference in Vienna a month later. The conference created INC - and made Mr Chalabi its president". Around the same time, the Jordan's Central Bank Governor, Mohammed Said Nabulsi, had referred to Chalabi as "one of the most notorious crooks in the history of the Middle East". Chalabi was involved in organizing a resistance movement among Kurds in northern Iraq in the early mid-1990s. When that effort was crushed, and hundreds of his supporters were killed, Chalabi fled the country. Chalabi lobbied in Washington for the passage of the Iraq Liberation Act (passed October 1998). This earmarked US$97 million to support Iraqi opposition groups. Chalabi and the INC were widely reported to be active CIA assets in the pre-2003 period, with one report in the British Guardian newspaper estimating that CIA operatives had funnelled an estimated $100m to the INC, which had helped to finance the epic failure of the 1996 coup attempt by Kurdish forces. In 2001 it was revealed that INC was accused of false accounting and irregularities. During the period from March 2000 to September 2003, the U.S. State Department paid nearly $33 million to the INC, according to a General Accounting Office report released in 2004, some of which was used to purchase office artefacts.

== Invasion of Iraq ==
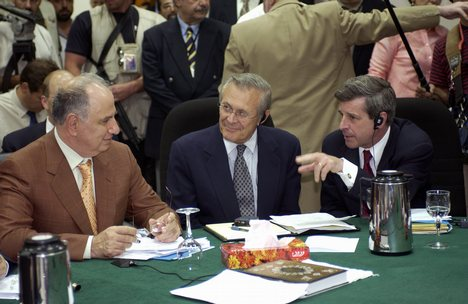
Chalabi in discussion with Paul Bremer and US Secretary of Defense Donald Rumsfeld

Before the Iraq War (2003), Chalabi enjoyed close political and business relationships with some members of the U.S. government, including some prominent neoconservatives within the Pentagon. Chalabi was said to have had political contacts within the Project for the New American Century, most notably with Paul Wolfowitz, a student of nuclear strategist Albert Wohlstetter, and Richard Perle. He also enjoyed considerable support among politicians and political pundits in the United States, most notably Jim Hoagland of The Washington Post, who held him up as a notable force for democracy in Iraq. He was a special guest of First Lady Laura Bush at the 2004 State of the Union Address. Chalabi was flown back to Iraq after the invasion with a force of 700 US-trained militia and was, according to the Washington Times, being paid over $300,000 a month by the US government, with the direct support of Vice President Dick Cheney, Deputy Defence Secretary Paul Wolfowitz, Richard Perle and Douglas Feith.

The CIA was largely skeptical of Chalabi and the INC, but information allegedly from his group (most famously from a defector codenamed "Curveball") made its way into intelligence dossiers used by President George W. Bush and British Prime Minister Tony Blair to justify an invasion of Iraq. "Curveball", Rafid Ahmed Alwan al-Janabi, fed officials hundreds of pages of bogus "firsthand" descriptions of mobile biological weapons factories on wheels and rails. Secretary of State Colin Powell later used this information in a U.N. presentation trying to garner support for the war, despite warnings from German intelligence that "Curveball" was fabricating claims. Since then, the CIA has admitted that the defector made up the story, and Powell said in 2011 the information should not have been used in his presentation. A later congressionally appointed investigation (Robb-Silberman) concluded that Curveball had no relation whatsoever to the INC, and that press reports linking Curveball to the INC were erroneous.

The INC often worked with the media, most notably with Judith Miller, concerning her WMD stories for The New York Times starting on 26 February 1998. After the war, given the lack of discovery of WMDs, most of the WMD claims of the INC were shown to have been either misleading, exaggerated, or completely made up while INC information about the whereabouts of Saddam Hussein's loyalists and Chalabi's personal enemies were accurate. Another of Chalabi's advocates was American Enterprise Institute's Iraq specialist Danielle Pletka. Chalabi received advice on media and television presentation techniques from the Irish scriptwriter and commentator Eoghan Harris prior to the invasion of Iraq.

During the initial ten days of the U.S. invasion of Iraq, American intelligence discovered signs that Ahmed Chalabi was communicating with the Iranians and sharing details about US troop movements with their government. While this act of betrayal angered the Americans, it was largely downplayed at the time. The U.S. aimed to prevent the conflict from spreading beyond Iraq's borders, so it was seen as beneficial that the Iranians were aware that U.S. troops had no intention of entering Iran. When questioned later about his dealings with the Iranian government during that period, Chalabi provided an ambiguous response: "I did not pass any information to Iran that compromised any national security information of the United States."

In April as U.S. forces took control during the 2003 Invasion of Iraq, Chalabi entered with allied troops the southern town of Shatrah. 300 US-trained FIF (Freedom for Iraq Fighters) expected opposition, but none emerged. Thousands of Iraqis cheered the troops. Chalabi returned under their aegis and was given a position on the Iraq interim governing council by the Coalition Provisional Authority. He served as president of the council in September 2003. He denounced a plan to let the UN choose an interim government for Iraq. "We are grateful to President Bush for liberating Iraq, but it is time for the Iraqi people to run their affairs," he was quoted as saying in The New York Times.

In May Chalabi helped, according to Harold Rhode, to rescue the books of the Iraqi Jewish Archive out of the basement of the Iraqi Intelligence Service by providing pumps to drain the water that flooded the basements and people to pull the books out

In August 2003, Chalabi was the only candidate whose unfavorable ratings exceeded his favorable ones with Iraqis in a State Department poll. In a survey of nearly 3,000 Iraqis in February 2004 (by Oxford Research International, sponsored by the BBC in the United Kingdom, ABC in the U.S., ARD of Germany, and the NHK in Japan), only 0.2 percent of respondents said he was the most trustworthy leader in Iraq (see survey link below, question #13). A secret document written in 2002 by the British Overseas and Defence Secretariat reportedly described Chalabi as "a convicted fraudster popular on Capitol Hill."

In response to the WMD controversy, Chalabi told London's The Daily Telegraph in February 2004,

We are heroes in error. As far as we're concerned, we've been entirely successful. That tyrant Saddam is gone and the Americans are in Baghdad. What was said before is not important. The Bush administration is looking for a scapegoat.

== Falling out with the U.S., 2004–05 ==
As Chalabi's position of trust with the Pentagon crumbled, he found a new political position as a champion of Iraq's Shia (Chalabi himself was Shia). Beginning 25 January 2004, Chalabi and his close associates promoted the claim that leaders around the world were illegally profiting from the Oil for Food program. These charges were around the same time that UN envoy Lakhdar Brahimi indicated that Chalabi would likely not be welcome in a future Iraqi government. Up until this time, Chalabi had been mentioned formally several times in connection with possible future leadership positions. Chalabi contended that documents in his possession detailed the misconduct, but he did not provide any documents or other evidence. The U.S. sharply criticized Chalabi's Oil for Food investigation as undermining the credibility of its own.

Additionally, Chalabi and other members of the INC were investigated for fraud involving the exchange of Iraqi currency, grand theft of both national and private assets, and many other criminal charges in Iraq. On 19 May 2004 the U.S. government discontinued their regular payments to Chalabi for information he provided. Iraqi police, supported by U.S. soldiers, raided his offices and residence on 20 May, taking documents and computers, presumably to be used as evidence. A major target of the raid was Aras Habib, Chalabi's long-term director of intelligence, who controlled the vast network of agents bankrolled by U.S. funding. The U.S. announced that it had stopped funding the INC, having previously paid the organization $330,000 per month.

In June 2004, it was reported that Chalabi gave U.S. state secrets to Iran in April, including the fact that one of the United States' most valuable sources of Iranian intelligence was a broken Iranian code used by their spy services. Chalabi allegedly learned of the code through a drunk American involved in the code-breaking operation. Chalabi denied all of the charges, but nothing ever came of it.

An arrest warrant for alleged counterfeiting was issued for Chalabi on 8 August 2004, while at the same time a warrant was issued on murder charges against his nephew Salem Chalabi (at the time, head of the Iraqi Special Tribunal), while they both were out of the country. Chalabi returned to Iraq on 10 August planning to make himself available to Iraqi government officials, but he was never arrested. Charges were later dropped against Chalabi, with Judge Zuhair al-Maliki citing lack of evidence.

On 1 September 2004, Chalabi told reporters of an assassination attempt made on him near Latifiya, a town south of Baghdad. Chalabi reported he was returning from a meeting with Ayatollah Ali al-Sistani (whose trust Chalabi enjoyed) in Najaf, where a few days earlier a cease-fire had taken effect, ending three weeks of confrontations between followers of Muqtada al-Sadr and the U.S. military, at the time.

He regained enough credibility to be made deputy prime minister on 28 April 2005. At the same time he was made acting oil minister, before the appointment of Ibrahim Bahr al-Uloum in May 2005. On protesting IMF austerity measures, Al-Uloum was instructed to extend his vacation by a month in December 2005 by Prime Minister Ibrahim al-Jaafari, and Chalabi was reappointed as acting oil minister. Al-Uloum returned to the post in January 2006.

In November 2005, Chalabi traveled to the U.S. and met with top U.S. government officials, including Vice President Dick Cheney, Secretary of State Condoleezza Rice, and National Security Advisor Stephen Hadley. At this time Chalabi also traveled to Iran to meet with Iranian president Mahmoud Ahmadinejad.

== Political activity in Iraq, 2005–15 ==
The Iraqi National Congress, headed by Chalabi, was a part of the United Iraqi Alliance in the 2005 legislative election. After the election, Chalabi claimed that he had the support of the majority of elected members of United Iraqi Alliance and staked claim to be the first democratically elected Prime Minister of Iraq; however, Ibrahim al-Jaafari later emerged as the consensus candidate for prime minister.

Prior to the December 2005 elections, the Iraqi National Congress had left the United Iraqi Alliance and formed the National Congress Coalition, which ran in the elections but failed to win a single seat in Parliament, gaining less than 0.5% of the vote. Other groups joining the INC in this list included: Democratic Iraqi Grouping, Democratic Joint Action Front, First Democratic National Party, Independent List, Iraqi Constitutional Movement, Iraqi Constitutional Party, Tariq Abd al-Karim Al Shahd al-Budairi, and the Turkoman Decision Party. He was refused a seat in the cabinet. Dogged by allegations, still unproven, of corruption he retorted that he had never "participated in any scheme of intelligence against the United States."

Chalabi attended the 2006 Bilderberg Conference meeting outside of Ottawa, Ontario, Canada. In October 2007, Chalabi was appointed by Prime Minister Nouri al Maliki to head the Iraqi services committee, a consortium of eight service ministries and two Baghdad municipal posts tasked with the "surge" plan's next phase, restoring electricity, health, education and local security services to Baghdad neighborhoods. "The key is going to be getting the concerned local citizens—and all the citizens—feeling that this government is reconnected with them.... [Chalabi] agrees with that," said Gen. David Petraeus. Chalabi "is an important part of the process," said Col. Steven Boylan, Petraeus' spokesman. "He has a lot of energy." In April 2008, journalist Melik Kaylan wrote about Chalabi, "Arguably, he has, more than anyone in the country, evolved a detailed sense of what ails Baghdadis and how to fix things."

After the invasion Chalabi was placed in charge of "de-Ba'athification"—the removal of senior office holders judged to have been close supporters of the deposed Saddam Hussein. The role fell into disuse, but in early 2010 Chalabi was accused of reviving this dormant post to eliminate his political enemies, especially Sunnis. The banning of some 500 candidates prior to the general election of 7 March 2010 at the initiative of Chalabi and his Iraqi National Congress was reported to have badly damaged previously improving relations between the Shia and Sunni.

Our national and political arena has lost a prominent figure who dedicated his life to serve the country

— Sheikh Humam Hamoudi, Statement on 3 November 2015

On 26 January 2012, The New York Times reported Western intelligence officials expressing concern that Chalabi was working with the leading opposition group in Bahrain, Al Wefaq National Islamic Society. A French intelligence official said, "When we hear that some members of the opposition are in touch with Hezbollah or with shady figures like the Iraqi Ahmed Chalabi, of whom we think he is acting on behalf of Iran, then this worries us". The connection between Chalabi and Al Wefaq was acknowledged by Jawad Fairooz, secretary general of Wefaq and a former member of Parliament in Bahrain. Fairooz said, "Mr Chalabi has helped us with contacts in Washington like other people have done and we thank them."

During an interview in 2014, he was shown to be frail and depressed about his country's future:

Iraq is a mess. Daesh is organised, with one command, united and well run, and we are so fragmented. We have no discipline, no command structure, no effective plans.

== Death ==
The period leading up to Chalabi's death was marked by regular pronouncements released by Chalabi in various formats in which he would expose alleged corruption of highest officials in the Paul Bremer-led Provisional Coalition Authority and in the Iraqi Government led by Nouri Al Maliki. Chalabi died on 3 November 2015, four days after his 70th birthday, having apparently suffered a heart attack at his home in Kadhimiya, Baghdad. Iraqi press speculated at the time of his death that it came about as a result of being poisoned due to his ongoing efforts to expose regime corruption. He died while serving as member of the Iraqi Parliament and chaired its Finance Committee. Ahmed Chalabi was laid to rest at the Kadhimiya Holy Shrine, a high honour bestowed by Iraq's influential Shia theocratic establishment.

Political offices
Preceded by Ibrahim al-Jaafari	President of the Governing Council of Iraq; 2003	Succeeded by Ayad Allawi
