= Iraq Liberation Act =

US Congressional statement of policy

Iraq Liberation Act of 1998
- Long title: An Act to establish a program to support a transition to democracy in Iraq.
- Acronyms (colloquial): ILA
- Nicknames: Iraq Liberation Act of 1998
- Enacted by: the 105th United States Congress
- Effective: October 31, 1998

Citations
- Public law: 105-338
- Statutes at Large: 112 Stat. 3178

Codification
- Titles amended: 22 U.S.C.: Foreign Relations and Intercourse
- U.S.C. sections amended: 22 U.S.C. ch. 32, subch. I § 2151

Legislative history
- Introduced in the House as H.R. 4655 by Benjamin Gilman (R–NY) on September 29, 1998; Committee consideration by House International Relations; Passed the House on October 5, 1998 (360–38 Roll call vote 482, via Clerk.House.gov); Passed the Senate on October 7, 1998 (Passed unanimous consent); Signed into law by President Bill Clinton on October 31, 1998

The Iraq Liberation Act of 1998 is a United States Congressional statement of policy stating that "It should be the policy of the United States to support efforts to remove the regime headed by Saddam Hussein from power in Iraq." It was signed into law by President Bill Clinton, and states that it is the policy of the United States to support democratic movements within Iraq. The Act was cited in October 2002 to argue for the authorization of military force against Iraq.

The bill was sponsored by Representative Benjamin A. Gilman (Republican, NY-20) and co-sponsored by Representative Christopher Cox (Republican, CA-47). The bill was introduced as H.R. 4655 on September 29, 1998. The House of Representatives passed the bill 360–38 on October 5, and the Senate passed it with unanimous consent two days later. President Clinton signed the Iraq Liberation Act into law on October 31, 1998.

Prominent Democrats, such as Carl Levin of Michigan, Tom Daschle of South Dakota, and John Kerry of Massachusetts, sent a letter to Clinton at that time urging him "to take necessary actions" to respond to Saddam's WMD programs (that they then believed existed). Levin said in October 1998, "I believe we must carefully consider other actions [if Saddam doesn't comply] including, if necessary, the use of force to destroy suspect sites." [Larry Schweikart, "America in the 21st Century: A History of the Past Quarter Century," page 73]

President George W. Bush, who followed Clinton, often referred to the Iraq Liberation Act and its findings to argue that the Clinton administration supported regime change in Iraq – and, further, that it believed Iraq was developing weapons of mass destruction. The Act was cited as a basis of support in the Congressional Authorization for Use of Military Force Against Iraq in October 2002.

== Findings and declaration of policy ==
The Act found that between 1980 and 1998 Iraq had:

1. committed various and significant violations of international law,
2. failed to comply with the obligations to which it had agreed following the Gulf War and
3. further had ignored resolutions of the United Nations Security Council.

The Act declared that it was the Policy of the United States to support "regime change." The Act was passed 360–38 in the U.S. House of Representatives and by unanimous consent in the Senate. US President Bill Clinton signed the bill into law on October 31, 1998. The law's stated purpose was: "to establish a program to support a transition to democracy in Iraq." Specifically, Congress made findings of past Iraqi military actions in violation of International Law and that Iraq had denied entry of United Nations Special Commission on Iraq (UNSCOM) inspectors into its country to inspect for weapons of mass destruction. Congress found: "It should be the policy of the United States to support efforts to remove the regime headed by Saddam Hussein from power in Iraq and to promote the emergence of a democratic government to replace that regime." On December 16, 1998, President Bill Clinton mandated Operation Desert Fox, a major four-day bombing campaign on Iraqi targets.

President Clinton stated in February 1998:

Iraq admitted, among other things, an offensive biological warfare capability, notably, 5,000 gallons of botulinum, which causes botulism; 2,000 gallons of anthrax; 25 biological-filled Scud warheads; and 157 aerial bombs. And I might say UNSCOM inspectors believe that Iraq has actually greatly understated its production. ...

Over the past few months, as [the weapons inspectors] have come closer and closer to rooting out Iraq's remaining nuclear capacity, Saddam has undertaken yet another gambit to thwart their ambitions by imposing debilitating conditions on the inspectors and declaring key sites which have still not been inspected off limits. ...

It is obvious that there is an attempt here, based on the whole history of this operation since 1991, to protect whatever remains of his capacity to produce weapons of mass destruction, the missiles to deliver them, and the feed stocks necessary to produce them. The UNSCOM inspectors believe that Iraq still has stockpiles of chemical and biological munitions, a small force of Scud-type missiles, and the capacity to restart quickly its production program and build many, many more weapons. ...

Now, let's imagine the future. What if he fails to comply and we fail to act, or we take some ambiguous third route, which gives him yet more opportunities to develop this program of weapons of mass destruction and continue to press for the release of the sanctions and continue to ignore the solemn commitments that he made? Well, he will conclude that the international community has lost its will. He will then conclude that he can go right on and do more to rebuild an arsenal of devastating destruction. And some day, some way, I guarantee you he'll use the arsenal. ...

— President Clinton ~ 1998

== Support for groups opposed to Saddam ==
This act required the President to designate one or more qualified recipients of assistance, with the primary requirement being opposition to the present Saddam Hussein regime. Such groups should, according to the Act, include a broad spectrum of Iraqi individuals, groups, or both, who are opposed to the Saddam Hussein regime, and are committed to democratic values, peaceful relations with Iraq's neighbors, respect for human rights, maintaining Iraq's territorial integrity, and fostering cooperation among democratic opponents of the Saddam Hussein regime. On February 4, 1999 President Clinton designated seven groups as qualifying for assistance under the Act. (see Note to 22 U.S.C. 2151 and 64 Fed. Reg. 67810). The groups were

1. The Iraqi National Accord,
2. The Iraqi National Congress,
3. The Islamic Movement of Iraqi Kurdistan,
4. The Kurdistan Democratic Party,
5. The Movement for Constitutional Monarchy,
6. The Patriotic Union of Kurdistan, and
7. The Islamic Supreme Council of Iraq.

The Act authorized the President to assist all such groups with: broadcasting assistance (for radio and television broadcasting), military assistance (training and equipment), and humanitarian assistance (for individuals fleeing Saddam Hussein). The Act specifically refused to grant the President authority to use U.S. Military force to achieve its stated goals and purposes, except as authorized under the Act in section 4(a)(2)) in carrying out this Act.

In November 1998 President Clinton stated that "The evidence is overwhelming that such changes will not happen under the current Iraq leadership."

== Contemplation of post-Saddam Iraq ==
The Act contemplated the future need for war crimes tribunals in Iraq stating, "The Congress urges the President to call upon the United Nations to establish an international criminal tribunal for the purpose of indicting, prosecuting, and imprisoning Saddam Hussein and other Iraqi officials who are responsible for crimes against humanity, genocide, and other criminal violations of international law."

A generalized statement of policy toward the post-Saddam Iraq was also set forth stating,

It is the sense of the Congress that once the Saddam Hussein regime is removed from power in Iraq, the United States should support Iraq's transition to democracy by providing immediate and substantial humanitarian assistance to the Iraqi people, by providing democracy transition assistance to Iraqi parties and movements with democratic goals, and by convening Iraq's foreign creditors to develop a multilateral response to Iraq's foreign debt incurred by Saddam Hussein's regime.

== Precursor to war ==
President George W. Bush, who followed Clinton, often referred to the Iraq Liberation Act and its findings to argue that the Clinton administration supported regime change in Iraq – and, further, that it believed Iraq was developing weapons of mass destruction. The Act was cited as a basis of support in the Congressional Authorization for Use of Military Force Against Iraq in October 2002.
