= Curveball (informant) =

Iraqi defector

Rafid Ahmed Alwan
- Born: Rafid Ahmed Alwan al-Janabi; 1968 (age 57–58); Iraq
- Other name: Curveball
- Education: Baghdad University

Rafid Ahmed Alwan al-Janabi (Arabic: رافد أحمد علوان الجنابي, Rāfid Aḥmad Alwān; born 1968), known by the Defense Intelligence Agency cryptonym "Curveball", is a German-French citizen who defected from Iraq in 1999, claiming that he had worked as a chemical engineer at a plant that manufactured mobile biological weapon laboratories as part of an Iraqi weapons of mass destruction (WMD) program. Alwan's allegations were subsequently shown to be false by the Iraq Survey Group's final report published in 2004. In 2011, Alwan admitted he "fabricate[d]" his claims in order to "topple the regime".

Despite warnings from the United States's Central Intelligence Agency, German Federal Intelligence Service and the British Secret Intelligence Service questioning the authenticity of the claims, the US and British governments utilized them to build a rationale for military action in the lead up to the 2003 invasion of Iraq, including in the 2003 State of the Union address, where the US president George W. Bush said, "We know that Iraq, in the late 1990s, had several mobile biological weapons labs", and US secretary of state Colin Powell's presentation to the United Nations Security Council, which contained a computer generated image of a mobile biological weapons laboratory. They were suggested to be mobile production trucks for artillery balloons. On 24 September 2002, the British government published its dossier on the former Iraqi leader's WMD with a personal foreword by British prime minister Tony Blair, who assured readers Iraqi president Saddam Hussein had continued to produce WMD "beyond doubt".

On 4 November 2007, the US television news program 60 Minutes revealed Curveball's real identity. Former CIA official Tyler Drumheller summed up Curveball as "a guy trying to get his green card essentially, in Germany, and playing the system for what it was worth". Alwan lives in Germany, where he has been granted asylum.

In a February 2011 interview with British newspaper The Guardian, Alwan "admitted for the first time that he lied about his story, then watched in shock as it was used to justify the war".

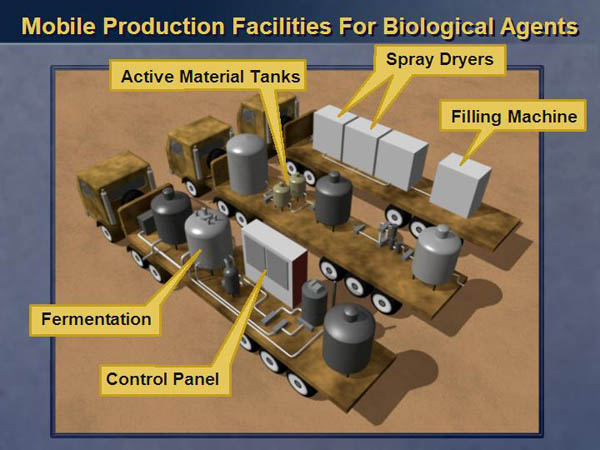
Computer-generated image of alleged mobile biological weapons laboratory, presented by Colin Powell at the UN Security Council.

== Claims and background ==
Rafid Ahmed Alwan studied chemical engineering at university but received low marks. He also worked at the Babel television production company in Baghdad, which was owned by Saddam Hussein's son Uday; sometime after leaving his job, a warrant was issued for his arrest because of theft from the same company.

Curveball's story began in November 1999 when Alwan, then in his early 30s, arrived at Munich's Franz Josef Strauss Airport with a tourist visa. Upon entering the country, he applied for political asylum because he had embezzled Iraqi government money and faced prison or worse if sent home. The German refugee system sent him to Zirndorf, a refugee center near Nuremberg.

After he arrived at the refugee center, he changed his story. Alwan's new story included that after he had graduated at the top of his chemical engineering class at Baghdad University in 1994, he worked for "Dr. Germ," the pseudonym of British-trained microbiologist Rihab Rashid Taha, to lead a team that built mobile labs to produce lethal biological WMD.

The Germans listened to his claims and debriefed him starting in December 1999, continuing to September 2001. Although the Americans did not have "direct access" to Curveball, information collected by the BND debriefing team was later passed on in part to the Defense Intelligence Agency in the United States. As an incentive to keep supplying information to German intelligence, Curveball had been granted asylum, as he had applied earlier in 1999 and failed. He had enough money that he did not have to work. He gave many hours of testimony about Iraq's WMD program and, in particular, its mobile weapons laboratories. Despite CIA technicians and weapon experts finding major flaws and inconsistencies with the designs and systems he asserted the military was developing, this information made it to the American government and although there were wide doubts and questions about the claimed informant's reliability and background, assertions attributed to Curveball claiming that Iraq was creating biological agents in mobile weapons laboratories to elude inspectors appeared in more than 112 United States government reports between January 2000 and September 2001. His assertions eventually made it into United States secretary of state Colin Powell's address on February 5, 2003 to the United Nations detailing Iraq's weapons programs.

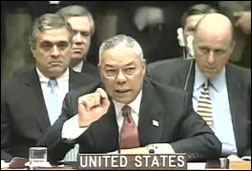
February 5, 2003 - United States secretary of state Colin Powell holding a model vial of anthrax while giving the presentation to the United Nations Security Council.

According to a Danish state TV documentary, DR1 Dokumentaren "Manden som løj verden i krig" broadcast on 21 April 2010, Curveball was still living in Germany under protection from the German police. Danish TV filmed Rafid and recorded clips of a conversation with him, before he called the police and had the TV crew banned from his neighbourhood.

== Criticism, investigation, and damage control ==
In 2003, inspectors led by David Kay conducted an additional investigation of Curveball's credibility. They found, among other things, that he had been placed last in his university class when he had claimed to have been placed first, and that he had been jailed for embezzlement before fleeing to Germany.

In response to public criticism, U.S. president Bush initiated an investigative commission that released their report on March 31, 2005. Bush's investigative commission came to many conclusions, including:

- Curveball's German intelligence handlers saw him as "crazy … out of control", his friends called him a "congenital liar", and a US physician working for the Defense Department who travelled to Germany to take blood samples seeking to discover if anthrax spores were present was stunned to find the defector had shown up for medical tests with a "blistering hangover", and that he "might be an alcoholic".
- While there were many reports that Curveball was actually a relative (younger brother) of one of Ahmed Chalabi's Iraqi National Congress (INC) top aides, the investigative commission stated that it was "unable to uncover any evidence that the INC or any other organisation was directing Curveball."
- The Bush administration ignored evidence from the UN weapons inspectors that Curveball's claims were false. Curveball had identified a particular Iraqi facility as a docking station for mobile labs. Satellite photography had shown a wall made such access impossible, but it was theorised that this wall was temporary. "When United Nations Monitoring, Verification and Inspection Commission (UNMOVIC) inspectors visited the site on February 9, 2003, they found that the wall was a permanent structure and could find nothing to corroborate Curveball's statements." Instead, the inspectors found the warehouse to be used for seed processing.

=== Blame ===
The Bush administration laid blame on the CIA, criticising its officials for "failing to investigate" doubts about Curveball, which emerged after an October 2002 National Intelligence Estimate. In May 2004, over a year after the invasion of Iraq, the CIA concluded formally that Curveball's information was fabricated. Furthermore, on June 26, 2006, The Washington Post reported that "the CIA acknowledged that Curveball was a con artist who drove a taxi in Iraq and spun his engineering knowledge into a fantastic but plausible tale about secret bioweapons factories on wheels."

On April 8, 2005, CIA director Porter Goss ordered an internal review of the CIA to determine why doubts about Curveball's reliability were not forwarded to policymakers. Former CIA director George Tenet and his former deputy, John E. McLaughlin, announced that they were not aware of doubts about Curveball's veracity before the war. However, Tyler Drumheller, the former chief of the CIA's European division, told the Los Angeles Times that "everyone in the chain of command knew exactly what was happening."

=== Admission of fabrication ===
In February 2011, Rafid Ahmed Alwan al-Janabi admitted for the first time that he lied about his story regarding Iraq's secret biological weapons program. Al-Janabi said "I had the chance to fabricate something to topple the regime. I and my sons are proud of that", referring to the Iraq War that toppled Saddam Hussein.

== Documentaries ==
According to the Danish film The Man Who Lied the World Into War, after he was found by the documentary makers and they put questions to the chief security and spy services of his new home country, he lost his job (in a company described by the document makers as a cover where his position had been "marketing specialist") and where he received a "salary with flat". After this, when he had to get back to the social one-room flat and live on social security benefits, he phoned the documentary makers proposing an interview for €40,000. He also showed papers which, according to him, clearly proved that a contract between him and this "cover company" had been signed for 15 years, starting in 1999/2000, with a monthly salary of €3,000.

Janabi also features in The spies who fooled the world, a 2013 Panorama documentary made by Peter Taylor for BBC Television, in which Janabi repeats the admissions of fabrication previously made to the Guardian newspaper.

== The name "Curveball" ==
Allegedly because the Iraqi informant disliked Americans, Germany's intelligence service (BND) classified him as a "blue" source, meaning the Germans would not permit U.S. access to him ("red" sources were allowed American contact). Later evidence indicated that he was in fact pro-American, and that the Germans were guarding their source. The Germans did pass on information to the American intelligence agencies, and the informant was given the codename "Curveball". Despite it being an American term, the Americans deny coining the name, and its origin is uncertain. The base cryptonym "ball" had been used during the Cold War when dealing with informants who had intelligence about weapons.

== See also ==
- Ahmed Chalabi
- Curveball (2020 film)
- Green Zone (2010 film)
- Niger uranium forgeries
