= WMD Commission =

WMD Commission usually refers to either:

- The Commission on the Prevention of WMD proliferation and terrorism
- The Weapons of Mass Destruction Commission
- The Commission on the Intelligence Capabilities of the United States Regarding Weapons of Mass Destruction
