= Iraq Survey Group =

Fact-finding mission

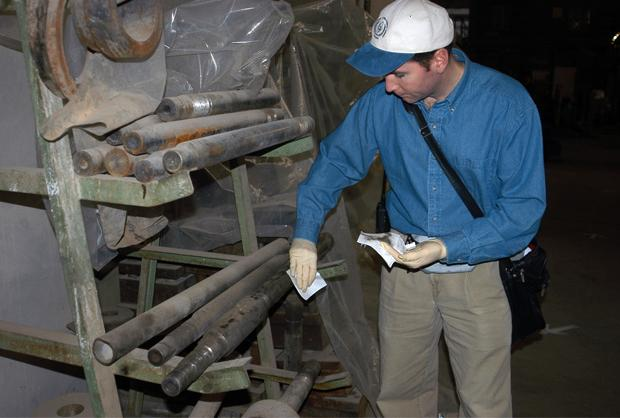
A UN weapons inspector in Iraq.

The Iraq Survey Group (ISG) was a fact-finding mission sent by the multinational force in Iraq to find the weapons of mass destruction alleged to be possessed by Iraq that had been the main ostensible reason for the invasion in 2003. Its final report, Comprehensive Report of the Special Advisor to the Director of Central Intelligence on Iraq WMD (commonly referred to as the Duelfer Report, named after the head of the ISG Charles A. Duelfer), was submitted to Congress and the president in 2004. It consisted of a 1,400-member international team organized by the Pentagon and Central Intelligence Agency to hunt for the alleged stockpiles of weapons of mass destruction, including chemical and biological agents, and any supporting research programs and infrastructure that could be used to develop WMD. The report acknowledged that only small stockpiles of chemical WMDs were found, the numbers being inadequate to pose a militarily significant threat.

== Formation ==
The ISG was made up of more than one thousand American, British and Australian citizens, with the United States providing the bulk of the personnel and resources for the operation. These people included civilian and military intelligence and WMD experts, as well as a large number of people working to provide armed security and support. David Kay, who had been a weapons inspector after the first Gulf War, was chosen to head the group. The agency tasked as the head U.S. government agency of the ISG was a joint venture of the CIA and the Defense Intelligence Agency (DIA), a Department of Defense intelligence agency. Chosen as the senior military officer of the ISG was MG Keith Dayton, who was tasked TDY from his assignment as Deputy Director, Human Intelligence, Defense Intelligence Agency.

The Iraq Survey Group replaced the United Nations inspections teams (the United Nations Monitoring, Verification and Inspection Commission (UNMOVIC), led by Hans Blix) and from the International Atomic Energy Agency (led by Mohamed ElBaradei), which had been mandated by the UN Security Council to search for illegal weapons before the conflict (See Iraq disarmament crisis). None had been found.

The ISG was a combined joint/multi-agency intelligence task force operating in support of Operation Iraqi Freedom (OIF). It was made up of personnel from all four services, US Government Agencies, the Australian and UK Armed Forces as well as UK and Australian Governmental Agencies. The ISG mission was to organize, direct, and apply intelligence capabilities and expertise to discover, capture, exploit and disseminate information on individuals, documents and other media, materials, facilities, networks, and operations relative to Weapons of Mass Destruction (WMD), Terrorism, Former Regime Intelligence, as well as Iraqi or Third-Country Nationals associated with the Former Regime, detained by the Former Regime, or subjects of Indictment for War Crimes or Crimes against Humanity.

The ISG's mission also included the ongoing investigation into the fate of United States Navy Captain Michael Scott Speicher, who was shot down in 1991 during the Gulf War. Initially presumed dead, he was later declared missing when evidence emerged after the war that he had survived the crash of his aircraft. On August 2, 2009, the Navy reported that Speicher's remains were found in Iraq by United States Marines belonging to MNF-W's Task Force Military Police. His jawbone was used to identify him after study at the Charles C. Carson Center for Mortuary Affairs at Dover Air Force Base. According to local civilians, Speicher was buried by Bedouins after his plane was shot down. The evidence proved that Speicher did not survive the crash. Senator Nelson attributed the delayed finding to the culture of the locality: "These Bedouins roam around in the desert, they don't stay in one place, and it just took this time to find the specific site."

== Organization and operations ==
To make the primary mission of WMD search more manageable, ISG was operationally divided up into several sectors each with its own Sector Control Point. The three sectors were North, Baghdad and South, with Sector Control Point-Baghdad (also known as SCP-B or "skip bee") being the primary and largest. The bulk of the ISG staff and SCP-B were located on Camp Slayer at the former Al Radwaniyah Presidential Site on Baghdad International Airport in western Baghdad. One of the major supporting elements of the ISG was the Combined Media Processing Center (CMPC). It consisted of four components, CMPC-Main (CMPC-M) at Camp Al Sayliyah, Qatar, CMPC-Baghdad (CMPC-B) located on Camp Slayer, as well as CMPC-North (CMPC-N), and CMPC-South (CMPC-S). The initial nucleus of the CMPC were drawn from DIA document exploitation personnel. By the summer of 2004, the CMPC had grown to over four hundred mostly civilian document and media processors and linguists/translators living and working primarily in CMPC-M at Camp Al Sayliyah, Qatar, and CMPC-B at Camp Slayer in Iraq.

Acting as an independent entity outside of the normal chain of command (ISG reported directly to Donald Rumsfeld), it surveyed and exploited hundreds of possible WMD sites across the breadth of Iraq with very few problems. There were two incidents which incurred fatalities. The first incident was a paint factory explosion of April 26, 2004, which killed two soldiers, US Army sergeants Lawrence Roukey, and Sherwood Baker, and injured several more. The mission had been previously abandoned because of security concerns. These were the ISG's first casualties in over a year of operations. The second was a vehicle-borne improvised explosive device (IED) attack against Charles Duelfer's convoy, which claimed the lives of two of Duelfer's Physical Security Detail, SSG Clinton Wisdom and SPC Don Clary, both of the Kansas Army National Guard's B Battery, 2/130th Field Artillery Battalion.

Throughout the life of ISG, there were two occasions where chemical weapons were found. The first was a single sarin mortar shell which had been reworked into a roadside IED by insurgents. The second was a handful of 122-millimeter rocket warheads filled with inert mustard gas that was recovered near Babylon. Both were thought to be remainders from the Iran–Iraq War, when Iraq was in some sense a US ally, and were useless as offensive weapons. They were later destroyed by ISG personnel. In late 2004 the ISG and the MCTs (mobile collection teams) undertook some counterinsurgency operations, although many details remain classified. There were other missions and organizations operating within the ISG which are Top Secret and are unlikely to be declassified anytime soon.

=== Sector Control Point – Baghdad ===
Sector Control Point-Baghdad (also known as SCP-B or "skip bee") was being the primary and largest of the Group's three operational groups. SCP-B, along with the core of the ISG staff, were located on Camp Slayer at the former Al Radwaniyah Presidential Site on Baghdad International Airport in western Baghdad.

From its founding in the spring of 2003 until disbandment at the end of February 2005, SCP-B was commanded by a series of coalition officers from the U.S. Army, U.S. Marines and Australian Army. Its first commander was U.S. Army Reserve Colonel George Waldroup, who led the group from its founding until the summer of 2004. He was later picked by U.S. Secretary of Defense Donald Rumsfeld to head the Strategic Support Branch of the Defense Intelligence Agency. Following COL Waldroup, USMC COL Frank Johnson was pulled from retirement and took the reins until October 2004. COL Johnson was followed by Lt Col Andy Carr, an Australian engineer, who was briefly followed by MAJ Peck (now LTC). The final commander of SCP-B was Australian Military Police Major Damien Hick.

SCP-B's missions included not only the search for WMD, but work on counter-terrorism and the ongoing investigation into the fate of U.S. Navy Captain Michael Scott Speicher, who was shot down during the Gulf War of 1991. Initially presumed dead, he was later declared missing when evidence emerged after the war that he had survived the crash of his aircraft.

SCP-B was organized into several Mobile Collection Teams, or MCTs, made up of members of American, British and Australian forces, with Americans providing the vast majority. An MCT generally consisted of a commander—usually a major or captain (although MCTs were led by lieutenants and full colonels at times) – and anywhere from ten to twenty other personnel, depending on mission requirements. The majority of SCP-B personnel were mobilized American National Guard or Army Reserve Soldiers (although the United States Navy, Marines and Air Force, as well several coalition forces, were also well represented) as well as some US Army Special Forces Personnel and a small detachment of active duty soldiers from the 1st Cavalry Division. The other key piece of SCP-B were the U.S. Army Military Police crews assigned to the organization. The Military Police provided convoy and site security for the MCTs as well as secure transport for ISG personnel in their travels around Baghdad. SCP-B also contained other special units, such as dog handlers (who were mostly civilian contractors), explosives ordnance disposal, ground-penetrating radar teams, satellite communications, and a WMD transportation and storage group.

== Interim Progress Report ==
After six months searching for WMD, the ISG issued an Interim Progress Report on October 3, 2003. The team said it had found evidence of "WMD-related program activities" but no actual chemical, biological or nuclear weapons. In addition to details of dormant WMD programs, the October 2003 report also includes discoveries of non-WMD programs banned by the UN and concealed during the International Atomic Energy Agency and UNMOVIC inspections that began in 2002. Lines of enquiry adopted by the ISG include the examination of sites across Iraq, as well as interviewing scientists, truck drivers and other workers with possible knowledge of WMD.

== David Kay resigns ==
On January 23, 2004, the head of the ISG, David Kay, resigned his position, stating that he believed WMD stockpiles would not be found in Iraq. "I don't think they existed," commented Kay. "What everyone was talking about is stockpiles produced after the end of the last Gulf War and I don't think there was a large-scale production program in the nineties." In a briefing to the Senate Armed Services Committee, Kay criticized the pre-war WMD intelligence and the agencies that produced it, saying "It turns out that we were all wrong, probably in my judgment, and that is most disturbing." Sometime earlier, CIA director George Tenet had asked David Kay to delay his departure: "If you resign now, it will appear that we don't know what we're doing. That the wheels are coming off."

Kay told the SASC during his oral report the following, though: "Based on the intelligence that existed, I think it was reasonable to reach the conclusion that Iraq posed an imminent threat. Now that you know reality on the ground as opposed to what you estimated before, you may reach a different conclusion-—although I must say I actually think what we learned during the inspection made Iraq a more dangerous place, potentially, than, in fact, we thought it was even before the war."

Kay's team established that the Iraqi regime had the production capacity and know-how to produce chemical and biological weaponry if international economic sanctions were lifted, a policy change which was actively being sought by a number of United Nations member states. Kay also believed some components of the former Iraqi regime's WMD program had been moved to Syria shortly before the 2003 invasion, though the Duelfer Report Addenda (see below) later reported there was no evidence of this.

On February 6, 2004, George W. Bush convened the Iraq Intelligence Commission, an independent inquiry into the intelligence used to justify the Iraq war and the failure to find WMD. This was shortly followed by the conclusion of a similar inquiry in the United Kingdom, the Butler Review, which was boycotted by the two main opposition parties due to disagreements on its scope and independence. In 2003, the US-sponsored search for WMD had been budgeted for $400 million, with an additional $600 million added in 2004.

Kay's successor, named by CIA director George Tenet, was the former UN weapons inspector Charles A. Duelfer, who stated at the time that the chances of finding any WMD stockpiles in Iraq were "close to nil."

== Duelfer Report ==
On September 30, 2004, the ISG released the Duelfer Report, its final report on Iraq's purported WMD programs. This report recorded the relationship of the Iraqi regime with WMD over time and in so doing investigated the decision making process, and underlying assumptions, of the regime. Key to the investigation was lengthy interviewing of all top officials including Saddam, examination of regime documents, and investigations of various sites in Iraq. Among its conclusions were:

- Saddam Hussein controlled all of the regime's strategic decision making.
- Hussein's primary goal from 1991 to 2003 was to have UN sanctions lifted, while maintaining the security of the regime.
- The introduction of the Oil-for-food program (OFF) in late 1996 was a key turning point for the regime.
- By 2000-2001, Hussein had managed to mitigate many of the effects of sanctions and undermine their international support.
- Iran was Iraq's pre-eminent motivator.
- The Iraq Survey Group (ISG) judged that events in the 1980s and early 1990s shaped Saddam's belief in the value of WMD.
- Hussein ended his nuclear program in 1991. ISG found no evidence of concerted efforts to restart the program, and Iraq's ability to reconstitute a nuclear weapons program progressively decayed after 1991.
- Iraq destroyed its chemical weapons stockpile in 1991, and only a small number of old, abandoned chemical munitions were discovered by the ISG.
- Hussein's regime abandoned its biological weapons program and its ambition to obtain advanced biological weapons in 1995. While it could have re-established an elementary BW program within weeks, ISG discovered no indications it was pursuing such a course.
- Hussein wanted to recreate Iraq's WMD capability, which was essentially destroyed in 1991, after sanctions were removed and Iraq's economy stabilized. Saddam aspired to develop a nuclear capability—in an incremental fashion, irrespective of international pressure and the resulting economic risks—but he intended to focus on ballistic missile and tactical chemical warfare (CW) capabilities.
- Hussein deceived his own army and the best intelligence agencies in the world into believing he still had WMDs because he believed none of his enemies would dare attack him if he had WMDs, notably Iran, "as there was a strong need to maintain the outward appearance of possessing a WMD capability to deter Iran."
- Hussein believed the US and the coalition that threatened to go to war against him if the UN resolutions were not met was bluffing.
- The pursuit of weapons of mass destruction in the 1980s was to assure Iraqi safety from Iranian aggression, and "this led to a difficult balancing act between the need to disarm to achieve sanctions relief while at the same time retaining a strategic deterrent. The regime never resolved the contradiction inherent in this approach."

== Operations Tempo 2004-2005 ==
Although the search for WMD had been conducted earnestly and fruitlessly during the initial year of the occupation, site exploitation continued through the summer of 2004. In late summer and early fall, the WMD search tempo slowed considerably; all of the most promising sites had been exploited in 2003-2004 and even most of the unpromising sites had been exploited by fall of 2004.

In late September and into October 2004, the number of site exploitations increased significantly, although most of these were revisits to already-exploited sites - some of which had been altered by Iraqis in the intervening months. For instance: the former Iraqi Chemical Brigade headquarters building in Baghdad was in the midst of being converted to office space when ISG personnel returned for a second visit.

ISG's exploitation operations mostly ceased in early November 2004. By early 2005, the MCTs were disbanded and all but two former MCT members, Army Sergeants 1st Class Marshall Lowery and Robert Shano, returned to their parent units and the MP teams that supported them were dispersed to other camps and given other missions. Lowery and Shano agreed to remain in Iraq and continue running convoys for the ISG until it was deactivated. Although Lowery rotated back to the US after the ISG was deactivated, Shano extended his tour in Iraq to serve with a group of coalition advisors mentoring the Iraqi officer candidates at the Military Academy in Al-Rustimaya.

In January 2005, the group announced the conclusion of its search. The ISG stated that while it had, "not found evidence that Saddam possessed WMD stocks in 2003," they acknowledged "the possibility that some weapons existed in Iraq, although not of a militarily significant capability."

== March 2005 Report Addenda ==
In March 2005 Duelfer added addenda to the original report, covering five topics:

- Prewar Movement of WMD Material Out of Iraq, stating "ISG judged that it was unlikely that an official transfer of WMD material from Iraq to Syria took place" but also acknowledging that there was evidence "about movement of material out of Iraq, including the possibility that WMD was involved," and that this evidence was "sufficiently credible to merit further investigation." IAG noted that, due to security concerns, it "was unable to complete its investigation and is unable to rule out the possibility that WMD was evacuated to Syria before the war."
- Residual Pre-1991 CBW Stocks in Iraq, concluding "any remaining chemical munitions in Iraq do not pose a militarily significant threat ... ISG has not found evidence to indicate that Iraq did not destroy its BW weapons or bulk agents".
- Residual Proliferation Risks: People, concluding "former WMD program participants are most likely to seek employment in the benign civil sector, either in Iraq or elsewhere ... However, because a single individual can advance certain WMD activities, it remains an important concern".
- Residual Proliferation Risk: Equipment and Materials, concluding "Iraq’s remaining chemical and biological physical infrastructure does not pose a proliferation concern".
- Iraqi Detainees, concluding "the WMD investigation has gone as far as feasible. ... there is no further purpose in holding many of these detainees".

In media interviews before the addenda were published, officials went further on the important question of the possible smuggling of WMD to Syria, saying they had not seen any information indicating that WMD or significant amounts of components and equipment were transferred from Iraq to neighboring Syria or elsewhere. Other details surfaced after the Duelfer Report, which helped fill in the blanks left by the ISG investigation. Duelfer also concluded that Saddam planned to resume production of weapons of mass destruction once the United Nations lifted economic sanctions.

== See also ==
- Rationale for the Iraq War
- WMD theories in the aftermath of the 2003 Iraq War
- Sector Control Point - Baghdad
