= McCain Institute =

International affairs think tank

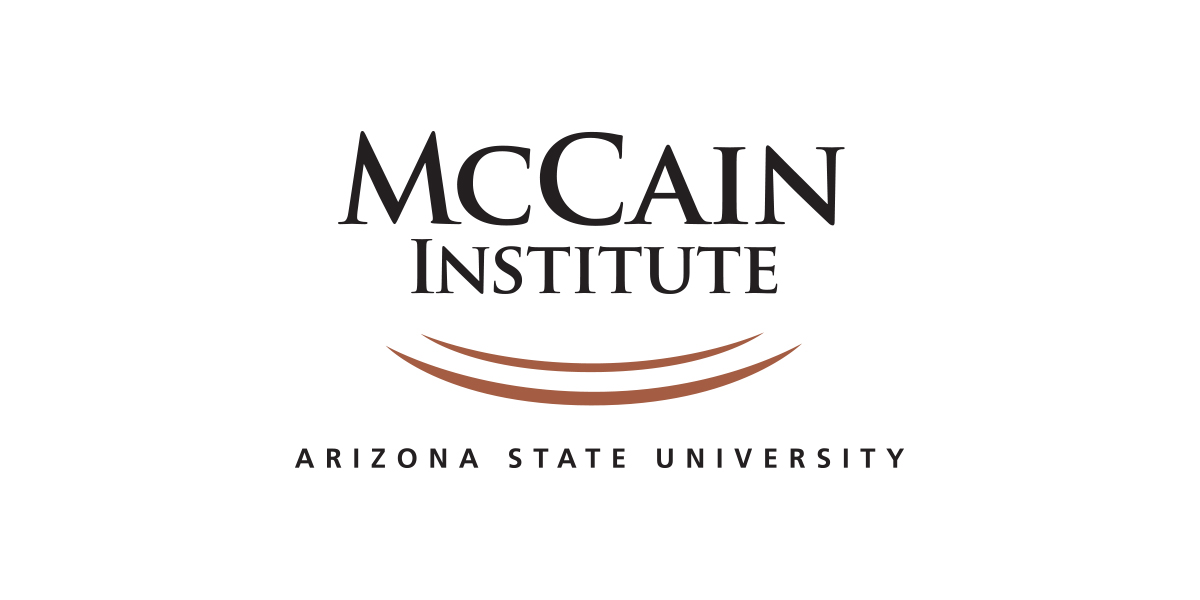
- Formation: 2012; 14 years ago
- Type: Nonprofit organization
- Headquarters: 1800 I Street NW, Washington D.C. 20006
- Location: Washington, D.C.
- Executive Director: Evelyn Farkas
- Website: www.mccaininstitute.org

The McCain Institute is a nonprofit organization based in Washington, D.C. and affiliated with Arizona State University. Established in 2012, it was launched from the $9 million surplus raised for U.S. Senator John McCain's 2008 presidential campaign. The Institute has frequently been described as a policy think tank, and conducts programs and events on democracy, human rights, national security, and leadership development. Its executive director is Evelyn Farkas.

== History ==
The McCain Institute was established in 2012 as a Washington-based policy center affiliated with Arizona State University. It was launched with approximately US$9 million left over from Senator John McCain's 2008 presidential campaign fund, which had been transferred into a nonprofit foundation. The Institute was formally inaugurated at an event in Washington, D.C., in May 2012, with the stated aim of carrying forward McCain’s public service legacy through programs on leadership and international affairs.

== Goals ==
The institute's stated goals are to provide decision recommendations for leaders, to publish relevant research, to identify and train new national security leaders, and to promote and preserve the McCain family's legacy.

== Funding ==
The McCain Institute is funded by donations from individuals, foundations, and corporations. As of 2024, past donors have included Wal-Mart, FedEx, SpaceX, Chevron, the embassies of Saudi Arabia and Denmark, Howard Graham Buffett and hedge fund owner Paul E. Singer.

In 2025, the Carnegie Corporation of New York awarded the Institute a US$500,000 grand to support its work on political prisoners and hostages.

== Initiatives ==
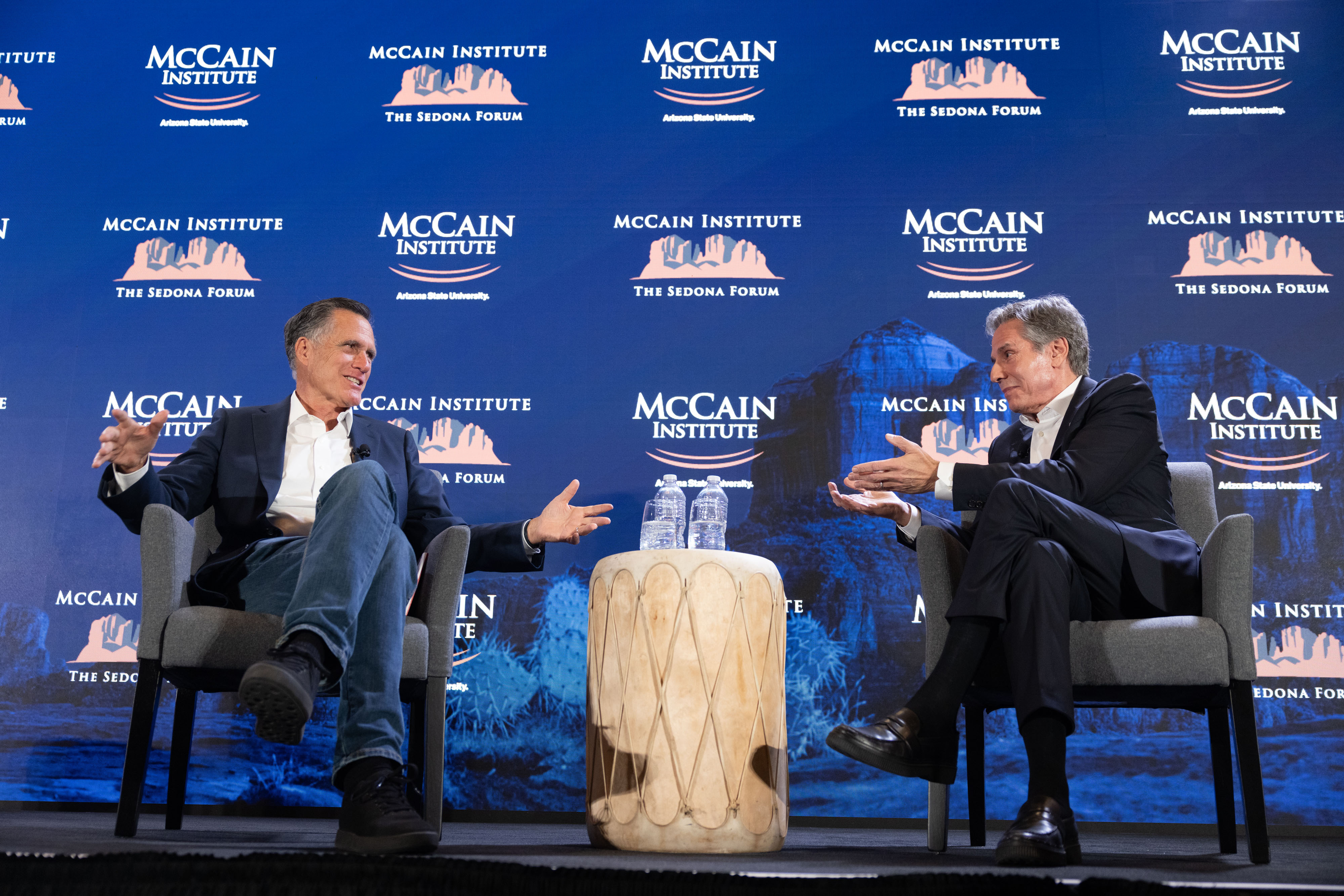
Sedona Forum 2024 guests Mitt Romney and Antony Blinken

The Institute hosts the Sedona Forum, an annual, invitation-only conference where international leaders and global security experts discuss global issues and solutions. It is held each spring in Sedona, Arizona. Previous attendees have included Secretary of State Antony Blinken, Senator Mitt Romney, and Treasury Secretary Janet Yellen.

The McCain Institute runs programs focused on human rights, democracy, and combating human trafficking. The Institute’s Preventing Targeted Violence program was created in 2020 with the goal of preventing hate-inspired violence and terrorism.
