= Evelyn Farkas =

American intelligence analyst (born 1967)

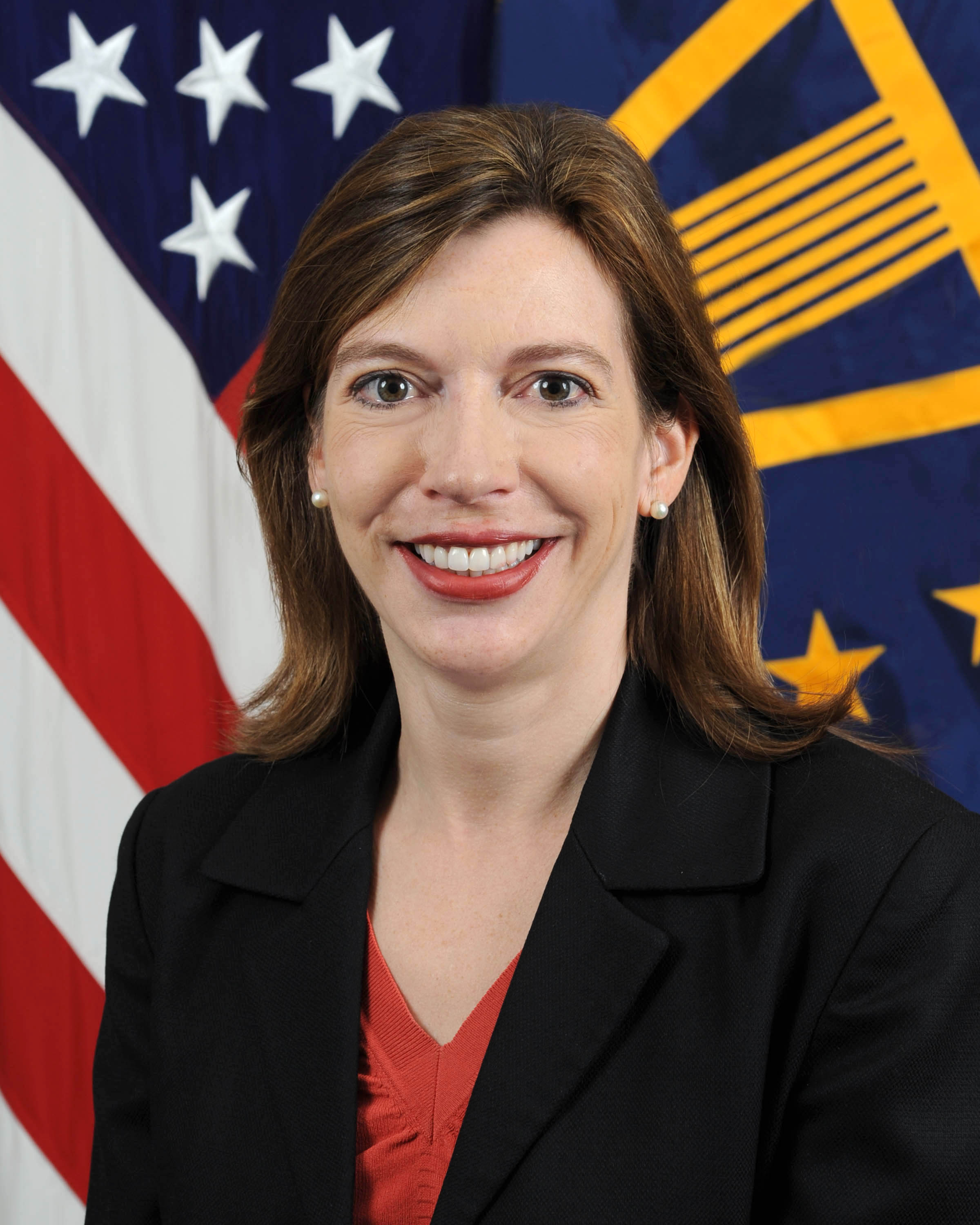

Executive Director of the McCain Institute
- Incumbent
- Assumed office 2 May 2022
- Preceded by: Josette Sheeran

Deputy Assistant Secretary of Defense for Russia, Ukraine, and Eurasia
- In office 2012–2015
- President: Barack Obama
- Preceded by: Celeste A. Wallander
- Succeeded by: Michael R. Carpenter

Personal details
- Born: December 6, 1967 (age 58)
- Party: Democratic
- Education: Franklin and Marshall College (BA); Tufts University (MA, PhD)

Evelyn Nicolette Farkas (born December 6, 1967) is an American national security advisor, author, and foreign policy analyst. She is the current executive director of the McCain Institute, a nonprofit focused on democracy, human rights, and character-driven leadership.

In 2012, Dr. Farkas was appointed by President Obama to serve as Deputy Assistant Secretary of Defense for Russia, Ukraine, and Eurasia. Before her appointment at the Department of Defense, Farkas served in various government positions, including as executive director for the bipartisan congressional Commission on the Prevention of WMD Proliferation and Terrorism. Following the announced retirement of Representative Nita Lowey, Farkas was a candidate to represent New York's 17th congressional district in the 2020 elections.

Farkas is a frequent national security contributor on national television programs on MSNBC, CNN, and BBCNews, and her writing has been published in the New York Times and the Washington Post, among other outlets. She is a member of the board of trustees at her alma mater, Franklin and Marshall College.

== Education ==
Farkas is the child of Charles and Edit Farkas, Hungarian political refugees who fled to America in the aftermath of the 1956 Hungarian Uprising. Evelyn's parents settled in Chappaqua, New York, after her father found work as the library director for the Briarcliff Manor Public Library. Growing up, Farkas exclusively spoke Hungarian at home and only started to learn English when she began kindergarten.

Farkas graduated from Horace Greeley, her local public high school, in 1985. She earned her B.A. from Franklin and Marshall College, graduating in 1989, and her M.A. and Ph.D. from the Fletcher School of Law and Diplomacy at Tufts University. She is fluent in Hungarian and German, speaks some Serbo-Croatian, French, and Spanish, and has studied Russian and Hindi.

== Career ==
Farkas began her career with the Council on Foreign Relations in New York and the International Institute for Applied Systems Analysis (IIASA) in Austria. As a Ph.D. student Farkas served in 1996 as a Human Rights Officer with the Organization for Security and Cooperation in Europe (OSCE) in Bosnia in the aftermath of the Yugoslav Wars. In 1997 Farkas joined the U.S. Marine Corps Command and Staff College as assistant professor and then associate professor of international relations.

In 2001 Farkas began working on Capitol Hill as a professional staff member of the Senate Armed Services Committee. Farkas was responsible for policy and budget oversight of the Department of Defense policy office and military commands including the U.S. Pacific Command, Special Operations Command, Southern Command, Northern Command, and U.S. Forces Korea. Her issue areas included foreign and defense policy worldwide regarding special operations, combating terrorism, foreign military assistance, peace and stability operations, counter-narcotics efforts, homeland defense, and export controls.

In 2008 Farkas was appointed by Senator Bob Graham, the Chairman of the Commission on the Prevention of Weapons of Mass Destruction Proliferation and Terrorism, better known as the WMD Commission to serve as executive director. The commission was created to further examine and recommend policy changes to address threats identified by the 9/11 Commission in the aftermath of the September 11th terrorist attacks. The WMD Commission published its report, World at Risk, in November 2008.

In 2009, Farkas joined the American Security Project as an adjunct fellow, where her work focused on counterterrorism, special operations, and nonproliferation policies, among other topics.

From 2010 to 2012 Farkas served as a senior advisor to the Supreme Allied Commander Europe, commander of North Atlantic Treaty Organization (NATO) forces in Europe, and as Special Advisor to Secretary of Defense Leon Panetta for the 2012 NATO Summit in Chicago.

In 2012 President Barack Obama appointed Farkas to serve as Deputy Assistant Secretary of Defense for Russia, Ukraine, and Eurasia. In this role, Farkas was responsible for U.S. defense policy in Russia, the Black Sea, Balkans, and Caucasus regions, as well as conventional arms control. She advised the Secretary of Defense and President regarding the U.S. response to Russia's invasion of Ukraine and annexation of Crimea in 2014-15 and the war in Donbas. Her office also spearheaded the effort to put Montenegro's membership on the NATO agenda and support for its accession.

After leaving the Department of Defense in 2015, Farkas joined a number of organizations to provide policy thought-leadership and national security analysis, including as a Senior Fellow at both the German Marshall Fund and the Atlantic Council, and as a National Security Analyst for NBC/MSNBC.

Farkas is also the founder and CEO of Farkas Global Strategies, a consultancy providing strategic advisory services to government, corporate, and non-profit entities.

== Russian election interference ==
In 2016 Farkas was one of the first to raise the alarm about Russia's interference in the 2016 election and ties between the Trump campaign and Russian officials and others with Kremlin ties. In March 2017, conservative news media and White House spokesperson Sean Spicer tried to place Farkas at the center of the controversy surrounding President Donald Trump's team and their ties with Russia. In an appearance on MSNBC on March 2, Farkas had commented that given what she knew about Kremlin motives, the quality of US intelligence on Russia, and Obama officials’ warnings, she was certain there was some communication and cooperation between the Russians and Americans.

Republicans in control of the House Permanent Select Committee on Intelligence, attempting to undermine investigations into Russian interference in the 2016 presidential election, invited Farkas to be questioned under oath on June 26, 2017, where they ascertained she was not drawing on intelligence to make her expert assessment.

== Congressional campaign ==
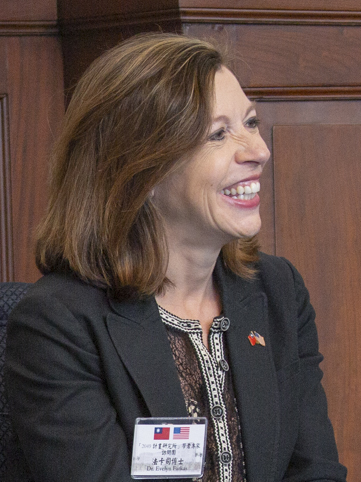
Evelyn Farkas visit to the Office of the President of Taiwan on 12 June 2019

Farkas moved back to her home district in Westchester, New York to succeed Representative Nita Lowey in New York's 17th congressional district. Despite endorsements from major Democratic figures such as former secretary of state John Kerry and former White House Chief of Staff Denis McDonough, Farkas finished in third place in the crowded Democratic primary with 15.6% of the vote.

New York's 17th Congressional District, 2020 Democratic Primary
Party	Candidate	Votes	%
Democratic	Mondaire Jones	32,794	41.91%
Democratic	Adam Schleifer	12,732	16.27%
Democratic	Evelyn Farkas	12,210	15.60%
Democratic	David Carlucci	8,648	11.05%
Democratic	David Buchwald	6,673	8.53%
Democratic	Asha Castleberry-Hernandez	2,062	2.64%
Democratic	Allison Fine	1,588	2.03%
Democratic	Catherine Parker	1,539	1.96%
Total votes		78,246	100.0%

== Awards and affiliations ==
Farkas is the recipient of numerous awards and honors for her public service work, including the Secretary of Defense Medal for Outstanding Public Service and Joint Chiefs of Staff Meritorious Civilian Service Award. Farkas is affiliated with numerous professional and community organizations. She sits on the board of trustees of Franklin and Marshall College and is a founding board member of the Leadership Council – Women in National Security. She is also on the board of the Project 2049 Institute and Support for Civil Society in Russia and is a member of the Council on Foreign Relations.

== Publications ==
- Farkas, E. (November 7, 2003). Fractured States and U.S. Foreign Policy: Iraq, Ethiopia, and Bosnia in the 1990s. Springer. ISBN 9781403982438.
