= Weapons of Mass Destruction Commission =

The Weapons of Mass Destruction Commission (WMDC) is established on an initiative by the late Foreign Minister of Sweden, Anna Lindh, acting on a proposal by then United Nations Under-Secretary-General Jayantha Dhanapala. The Swedish Government invited Hans Blix to set up and chair the Commission. He presented the composition of the Commission to the public on 16 December 2003 and explained what he saw were major tasks for it.

The Commission commenced its work against the background of more than a half-century's striving for non-proliferation, arms control and disarmament of weapons of mass destruction. While there has been much success and progress, especially after the end of the Cold War, there have been many difficulties and disappointments in recent years. The technical evolution and the access to knowledge have also reduced some barriers to the acquisition of weapons. The possession and potential use of weapons of mass destruction by states or non-state actors remain ever-present risks. The slowdown and stalemate in the fields of non-proliferation, arms control and disarmament needs to be reversed and the momentum needs to be regained. Major contributions to national and international security would result.

The report of the Weapons of Mass Destruction Commission with the proposals on how to reduce as far as possible the dangers of weapons of mass destruction was presented to the UN Secretary-General and the international community on 1 June 2006.

== See also ==
- Commission on the Intelligence Capabilities of the United States Regarding Weapons of Mass Destruction
- Commission on the Prevention of WMD proliferation and terrorism
