= Charles A. Duelfer =

American weapons inspector and intelligence official

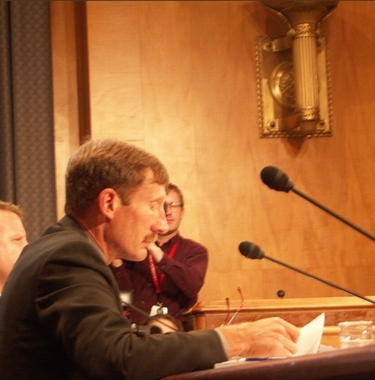
Charles Duelfer

Charles A. Duelfer is an American weapons inspector and intelligence official. He led the Iraq Survey Group, the body charged with searching for weapons of mass destruction in Iraq after the 2003 invasion, and was the principal author of its final report, formally the Comprehensive Report of the Special Advisor to the Director of Central Intelligence on Iraq's WMD and widely known as the Duelfer Report, which concluded that Iraq had destroyed its stocks of chemical and biological weapons and abandoned its nuclear program after the 1991 Gulf War. He is Chairman of Omnis, Inc., a consulting firm in aerospace, defense, intelligence, training, and finance. He is a regular commentator in the media on intelligence and foreign policy and is the author of Hide and Seek: The Search for Truth in Iraq.

== Career ==
=== United Nations Special Commission ===
Previously, Duelfer was the Deputy Executive Chairman and then Acting Chairman of the UN Special Commission on Iraq (UNSCOM) from 1993 until its termination in 2000.

=== Iraq Survey Group ===
On 23 January 2004 Duelfer succeeded David Kay as head of the Iraq Survey Group, and served as Special Advisor to the Director of Central Intelligence on Iraqi weapons of mass destruction. Kay had resigned after concluding that prewar intelligence on Iraqi weapons had been mistaken.

On 8 November 2004 a vehicle-borne improvised explosive device was detonated against Duelfer's convoy in Baghdad. Two soldiers of the Kansas Army National Guard escorting him, Staff Sergeant Clinton L. Wisdom and Specialist Don A. Clary, placed their vehicle between the convoy and the attacking car and were killed. They were the first combat fatalities suffered by the Kansas National Guard since the Vietnam War.

=== Duelfer Report ===
The Iraq Survey Group's Comprehensive Report, dated 30 September 2004, found that Iraq had destroyed its chemical and biological weapons stockpiles and ended its nuclear weapons program after the 1991 Gulf War, and that no stockpiles remained at the time of the 2003 invasion. Duelfer presented the findings to the Senate Armed Services Committee on 6 October 2004. He testified that the group had found no evidence of a concerted effort to restart the nuclear program after 1991, and that although Saddam Hussein had not abandoned his nuclear ambitions, Iraq's capacity to build such weapons and to retain the necessary specialists had decayed under sanctions.

The report also concluded that Saddam intended to resume weapons production if sanctions were lifted, and documented irregularities in the Oil-for-Food Programme, including bribes paid to officials of other states.

=== Later career ===
Duelfer subsequently headed a small commercial space launch company before becoming chairman of Omnis, Inc.

== Publications ==
- Duelfer, Charles A. (2009). Hide and Seek: The Search for Truth in Iraq. PublicAffairs. ISBN 978-1-58648-557-3.
