= Graham/Talent WMD Commission =

The Commission on the Prevention of Weapons of Mass Destruction Proliferation and Terrorism (commonly known as the Graham/Talent WMD Commission) of the United States Congress was set up "to assess, within 180 days, any and all of the nation's activities, initiatives, and programs to prevent weapons of mass destruction proliferation and terrorism." The Graham/Talent WMD Commission was also asked to provide concrete recommendations- a roadmap- to address these threats.

The Graham/Talent WMD Commission is a legacy of the 9/11 Commission, which within the 9/11 Commission Report recommended for the creation of a commission to further examine these grave threats. House Resolution 1 (Sec. 1851) established the Graham/Talent WMD Commission.

Chaired by former U.S. Senator Bob Graham of Florida, along with vice-chair and former U.S. Senator Jim Talent of Missouri, the commission consists of seven additional individuals.

The commission's final report was released on December 3, 2008. The report was based on extensive research and provides 13 recommendations. The Commission held more than 250 interviews with government and nongovernmental experts, eight major commission hearings and one public hearing.

The risk assessment of the report states, “Unless the world community acts decisively and with great urgency, it is more likely than not that a weapon of mass destruction will be used in a terrorist attack somewhere in the world by the end of 2013.” After the publication of its final report, the commission was reauthorized by Congress to implement the recommendations.

== History ==
The creation of the Commission, which was established by House Resolution 1, implements a key recommendation of the independent, bipartisan 9/11 Commission to address the grave threat that the proliferation of weapons of mass destruction poses to our country.

In its first year, the Commission assessed the nation's current activities, initiatives, and programs aimed at preventing the proliferation of weapons of mass destruction and terrorism while providing a clear, comprehensive strategy with concrete recommendations to achieve this crucial goal. The Commission issued its report in December 2008.

During its second year of activity, the Commission is working to improve understanding of its findings—and to turn those concrete recommendations into actions. Specifically, the Commission is focusing on activities relating to:

- Threat awareness, which helps generate urgency, particularly in this time of many competing government priorities
- Bioterrorism, which the Commission identified as the most likely threat
- Nuclear proliferation, which most of the recommendations address
- Government reform, especially steps that will make addressing bio and nuclear threats more effective
- Citizen/community engagement, to encourage an engaged citizenry.

== Members ==
Chairman
Bob Graham

Vice Chairman
Jim Talent

Commissioners
Graham Allison
Robin Cleveland
Wendy Sherman
Henry Sokolski
Stephen Rademaker
Timothy Roemer
Richard Verma

Commission Staff
Evelyn N. Farkas, Executive Director
Eric K. Fanning, Deputy Director
Rajesh De, General Counsel

Professional Staff
Amir M. Abdmishani, Professional Staff Member
Erin R. Mahan, Professional Staff Member
Georgia A. Adams, Professional Staff Member
Maurice A. Mallin, Professional Staff Member
Amy A. Berg, Staff Assistant
David E. McCracken, Professional Staff Member
Jennifer C. Boone, Professional Staff Member
Jamison D. Pirko, Staff Assistant
Sylvia Boone, Administrative Officer
Neal A. Pollard, Director for Counterterrorism
Robert DiNardo, Professional Staff Member
Don A. Puglisi, Professional Staff Member
Andrew B. Duberstein, Intern
William R. Reed, Professional Staff Member
Alice Falk, Editor
Constance T. Rybka, Chief of Security
Thomas W. Graham, Professional Staff Member
Martin Schram, Consultant
Stephen G. Heil, Professional Staff Member
Wade R. Sharp, Security Officer
Joseph Helman, Director for Intelligence
Jonathan B. Tucker, Professional Staff Member
Adam J. Jones, Professional Staff Writer
Jenee B. Tyler, Intern
Abraham C. Kanter, Staff Assistant
Adam K. VanDervort, Professional Staff Member
Sam E. Kessler, Special Assistant to the Executive Director
Kenneth D. Ward, Professional Staff Member
George W. Look, Director for Nonproliferation/Counterproliferation

== Resolution creating the Commission ==
Subtitle E: Commission on the Prevention of Weapons of Mass Destruction Proliferation and Terrorism - (Sec. 1851) Establishes the Commission on the Prevention of Weapons of Mass Destruction Proliferation and Terrorism to assess and provide a clear and comprehensive strategy and concrete recommendations for prevention activities, initiatives, and programs.

Directs the Commission to: (1) give particular attention to activities, initiatives, and programs to secure all nuclear weapons-usable material around the world; (2) significantly accelerate, expand, and strengthen U.S. and international efforts to prevent, stop, and counter the spread of nuclear weapons capabilities and related equipment, material, and technology to terrorists and states of concern; (3) address the roles, mission, and structure of all relevant government agencies and other actors, interagency coordination, U.S. commitments to international regimes and cooperation with other countries, and the threat of WMD proliferation and terrorism to the United States and its interests and allies; (4) reassess, update, and expand on the conclusions and recommendations of the Baker-Cutler Report; and (5) submit a final report on corrective measures to the President and Congress.

== Recommendations ==
The 13 Recommendations from the report, World at Risk, are listed below.

1. The United States should undertake a series of mutually reinforcing domestic measures to prevent bioterrorism.
2. The United States should undertake a series of mutually reinforcing measures at the international level to prevent biological weapons proliferation and terrorism.
3. The United States should work internationally toward strengthening the nonproliferation regime, reaffirming the vision of a world free of nuclear weapons.
4. The new President should undertake a comprehensive review of cooperative nuclear security programs, and should develop a global strategy that accounts for the worldwide expansion of the threat and the restructuring of our relationship with Russia from that of donor and recipient to a cooperative partnership.
5. As a top priority, the next administration must stop the Iranian and North Korean nuclear weapons programs.
6. The next President and Congress should implement a comprehensive policy toward Pakistan that works with Pakistan and other countries to (1) eliminate terrorist safe havens through military, economic, and diplomatic means; (2) secure nuclear and biological materials in Pakistan; (3) counter and defeat extremist ideology; and (4) constrain a nascent nuclear arms race in Asia.
7. The next U.S. administration should work with the Russian government on initiatives to jointly reduce the danger of the use of nuclear and biological weapons.
8. The President should create a more efficient and effective policy coordination structure by designating a White House principal advisor for WMD proliferation and terrorism and restructuring the National Security Council and Homeland Security Council.
9. Congress should reform its oversight both structurally and substantively to better address intelligence, homeland security, and crosscutting 21st-century national security missions such as the prevention of weapons of mass destruction proliferation and terrorism.
10. Accelerate integration of effort among the counterproliferation, counterterrorism, and law enforcement communities to address WMD proliferation and terrorism issues.
11. The United States must build a national security workforce for the 21st century.
12. U.S. counterterrorism strategy must more effectively counter the ideology behind WMD terrorism. The United States should develop a more coherent and sustained strategy and capabilities for a global ideological engagement to prevent future recruits, supporters, and facilitators.
13. The next administration must work to openly and honestly engage the American citizen, encouraging a participatory approach to meeting the challenges of the new century.

== See also ==
- Commission on the Intelligence Capabilities of the United States Regarding Weapons of Mass Destruction
- Weapons of Mass Destruction Commission
