= David Kay =

American weapons inspector (1940–2022)

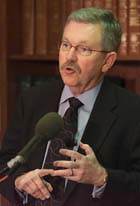
Kay in 2002

David A. Kay (June 8, 1940 – August 13, 2022) was an American weapons expert, political commentator, and senior fellow at the Potomac Institute for Policy Studies. He was best known for his time as United Nations Chief Weapons Inspector following the first Gulf War and for leading the Iraq Survey Group's search for weapons of mass destruction following the 2003 invasion of Iraq. Upon presentation of the Group's finding that there had been significant errors in pre-war intelligence concerning Iraq's weapons programs, Kay resigned. The ensuing controversy served as impetus for the formation of the Iraq Intelligence Commission.

== Education ==
Kay received a Bachelor of Arts degree from the University of Texas at Austin, and also a master's in International Affairs and a Ph.D. from Columbia University's School of International and Public Affairs.

Kay was an Assistant Professor of Political Science at the University of Wisconsin (Madison). Kay later worked for the International Atomic Energy Agency (IAEA) in an administrative position as head of the Evaluation Section and, as recommended by the US Mission to that Agency, he was named the UN Chief Weapons Inspector from 1991 to 1992. Following that, he was a Vice President at Science Applications International Corporation (SAIC) from 1993 to 2002. He was then appointed a Special Advisor for Strategy regarding Iraqi Weapons of Mass Destruction (WMD) Programs. He received the International Atomic Energy Agency's Distinguished Service Award and the U.S. Secretary of State's Commendation.

After the 1991 Gulf War, Kay led teams of inspectors of the International Atomic Energy Agency in Iraq to search out and destroy banned chemical, biological, and nuclear weapons. Following the U.S. invasion of Iraq, he returned to the country, working with the Central Intelligence Agency and U.S. military in 2003 and 2004 to determine if Saddam Hussein's regime had continued developing banned weapons.

== Iraq Survey Group ==
The research of his team determined that the Iraqi unconventional weapons programs had mostly been held in check, with only small amounts of banned material uncovered (this included a number of vials containing biological agents stored in the home refrigerators of Iraqi scientists, for example). None of these substances had been "weaponized" — no such agents were found in missiles or artillery, and none could be easily installed. These discoveries indicate that some of the primary reasons President George W. Bush used for going to war with Iraq did not reflect the true situation in that country, and contradicted statements made by Kay himself in the lead-up to the war.

Before the 2003 war, as U.S. Government officials were pushing the idea that Saddam Hussein was in possession of WMD, many people would direct reporters toward David Kay to reinforce their point of view. In September 2002, Kay told U.S. News & World Report that "Iraq stands in clear violation of international orders to rid itself of these weapons." His credibility as a former U.N. weapons inspector convinced many observers.

On January 23, 2004, Kay resigned, stating that Iraq did not have WMD and that "I think there were stockpiles at the end of the first Gulf War and a combination of U.N. inspectors and unilateral Iraqi action got rid of them." Kay was replaced by Charles Duelfer and spent the following days discussing his discoveries and opinions with the news media and the U.S. political establishment. On January 28, 2004, he testified that “[i]t turns out that we were all wrong” and “I believe that the effort that has been directed to this point has been sufficiently intense that it is highly unlikely that there were large stockpiles of deployed, militarized chemical weapons there.” However, Kay defended the Bush administration, saying that even if Iraq did not have weapons stockpiles, this did not mean that it wasn't dangerous. Kay also blamed faulty intelligence gathering for the prewar WMD conclusions. On February 2, 2004, Kay met with George W. Bush at the White House and maintained that Bush was right to go to war in Iraq and characterized Saddam Hussein's government as “far more dangerous than even we anticipated” when it was thought he had WMDs ready to deploy.

=== Testimony before House and Senate committees ===
In testimony on the progress of the Iraq Survey Group on October 2, 2003, he revealed to House and Senate committees that the ISG had found that Iraq had a network of clandestine laboratories containing equipment that should have been (but was not) disclosed to UN inspectors. He also said that the ISG found an undeclared prison laboratory complex and an undeclared Unmanned Aerial Vehicle production facility. The Iraq Survey Group also found out that a UAV had been test flown out to a range of 500 kilometers, even though the agreed upon limit was 150 kilometers. Kay said that Iraq lied to the UN about the range of that particular UAV.

He testified that Iraq had done research on Congo Crimean Hemorrhagic Fever and Brucella but had not declared this to the UN. Iraq also continued research and development work on anthrax and ricin without declaring it to the UN.

Kay told the committees that, between 1999 and 2002, Iraq attempted to obtain missile technology from North Korea that would allow them to build missiles with a range of 1300 kilometers, far beyond the UN limit of 150 kilometers that Iraq agreed upon in UN Resolution 687. They also sought anti-ship missiles with a range of 300 kilometers from North Korea.

"With regard to delivery systems, the ISG team has discovered sufficient evidence to date to conclude that the Iraqi regime was committed to delivery system improvements that would have, if OIF had not occurred, dramatically breached UN restrictions placed on Iraq after the 1991 Gulf War," Kay testified.

=== Subsequent interviews ===
After the interview, Kay told National Public Radio that Iraq "had a large number of WMD program-related activities." He said "So there was a WMD program. It was going ahead. It was rudimentary in many areas." Kay also said that Iraq had been trying to weaponize ricin "right up until" Operation Iraqi Freedom; a claim not supported by the Iraq Survey Group final report.

=== Resignation ===
On January 23, 2004, the head of the ISG, David Kay, resigned his position, stating that he believed WMD stockpiles would not be found in Iraq. "I don't think they existed," commented Kay. "What everyone was talking about is stockpiles produced after the end of the last Gulf War and I don't think there was a large-scale production program in the nineties." In a briefing to the Senate Armed Services Committee (SASC), Kay criticized the pre-war WMD intelligence and the agencies that produced it, saying "It turns out that we were all wrong, probably in my judgment, and that is most disturbing." Sometime earlier, CIA director George Tenet had asked David Kay to delay his departure: "If you resign now, it will appear that we don't know what we're doing. That the wheels are coming off."

Kay told the SASC during his oral report the following, though: "Based on the intelligence that existed, I think it was reasonable to reach the conclusion that Iraq posed an imminent threat. Now that you know reality on the ground as opposed to what you estimated before, you may reach a different conclusion — although I must say I actually think what we learned during the inspection made Iraq a more dangerous place, potentially, than, in fact, we thought it was even before the war."

Kay's team established that the Iraqi regime had the production capacity and know-how to produce chemical and biological weaponry if international economic sanctions were lifted, a policy change which was actively being sought by a number of United Nations member states. Kay also believed some components of the former Iraqi regime's WMD program had been moved to Syria shortly before the 2003 invasion, though the Duelfer Report Addenda (see below) later reported there was no evidence of this.

Kay explained the situation in Iraq before the war further in a February 1, 2004 interview on Fox News Sunday: "I think Iraq was a dangerous place and becoming more dangerous, because, in fact, what we observe is that the regime itself was coming apart. It was descending into worse the part of moral depravity and corruption. Saddam was isolated in a fantasy land capable of wreaking tremendous harm and terror on his individual citizens, but corruption, money gain was the root cause. At the same time that we know there were terrorist groups in state still seeking WMD capability. Iraq, although I found no weapons, had tremendous capabilities in this area. A marketplace phenomena was about to occur, if it did not occur; sellers meeting buyers. And I think that would have been very dangerous if the war had not intervened." [sic]

On February 6, 2004, George W. Bush convened the Iraq Intelligence Commission, an independent inquiry into the intelligence used to justify the Iraq war and the failure to find WMD. This was shortly followed by the conclusion of a similar inquiry in the United Kingdom, the Butler Review, which was boycotted by the two main opposition parties due to disagreements on its scope and independence.([4]) In 2003, the US-sponsored search for WMD had been budgeted for $400 million, with an additional $600 million added in 2004.

Kay's successor, named by CIA Director George Tenet, was former UN weapons inspector Charles Duelfer, who stated at the time that the chances of finding any WMD stockpiles in Iraq were "close to nil."

== Personal life ==
Kay was born in Houston, Texas. He retired to Ocean View, Delaware, with his wife. He died of cancer on August 13, 2022, at his home. He is survived by his second wife, a daughter from his first marriage, and two grandchildren.

== See also ==
- David Kelly - Similarly named British weapons expert known for challenging his government's actions at the start of the Iraq War
- Iraq Survey Group
- Iraq and weapons of mass destruction
- Timeline of the Iraq War
