= Iraq Intelligence Commission =

United States government body

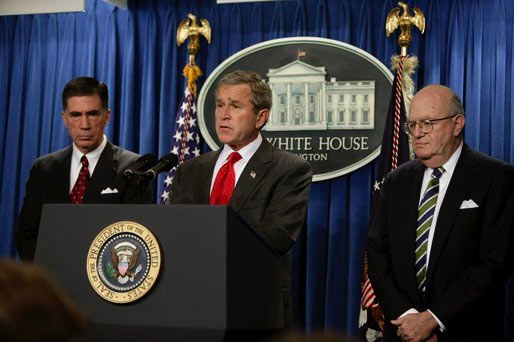
President Bush holds a press briefing at the White House on Friday, February 6, 2004, announcing the formation of the commission. He is flanked by commission co-chairs Senator Charles Robb (left) and Judge Laurence Silberman (right).

The Commission on the Intelligence Capabilities of the United States Regarding Weapons of Mass Destruction is a panel created by Executive Order 13328, signed by U.S. president George W. Bush in February 2004.

The impetus for the Commission lay with a public controversy occasioned by statements, including those of Chief of the Iraq Survey Group, David Kay, that the Intelligence Community had grossly erred in judging that Iraq had been developing weapons of mass destruction (WMD) before the March 2003 start of Operation Iraqi Freedom. President Bush therefore formed the Commission, but gave it a broad mandate not only to look into any errors behind the Iraq intelligence, but also to look into intelligence on WMD programs in Afghanistan and Libya, as well as to examine the capabilities of the Intelligence Community to address the problem of WMD proliferation and "related threats." However, the commission was not directed to examine the extent to which the Bush administration may have manipulated the intelligence.

Following intense study of the American Intelligence Community, the Commission delivered its report to the President on March 31, 2005, the so-called Robb-Silberman Report.

== Findings ==
Regarding Iraq, the Commission concluded that the United States Intelligence Community was wrong in almost all of its pre-war judgments about Iraq's alleged weapons of mass destruction and that this constituted a major intelligence failure.

The Intelligence Community's performance in assessing Iraq's pre-war weapons of mass destruction programs was a major intelligence failure. The failure was not merely that the Intelligence Community's assessments were wrong. There were also serious shortcomings in the way these assessments were made and communicated to policymakers.

— Unclassified version of the commission's report, p. 46

The Commission's report also described systemic analytical, collection, and dissemination flaws that led the intelligence community to erroneous assessments about Iraq's alleged WMD programs. Chief among these flaws were "an analytical process that was driven by assumptions and inferences rather than data", failures by certain agencies to gather all relevant information and analyze fully information on purported centrifuge tubes, insufficient vetting of key sources, particularly the source "Curveball," and somewhat overheated presentation of data to policymakers.

The 601-page document detailed many U.S. intelligence failures and identified intelligence breakdowns in dozens of cases. Some of the conclusions reached by the report were:

- the report notes in several places that the commission's mandate did not allow it "to investigate how policymakers used the intelligence they received from the Intelligence Community on Iraq's weapons programs,"
- One of the main and crucial intelligence sources for the case in Iraq was an informant named Curveball. Curveball had never been interviewed by American intelligence until after the war and was instead handled exclusively by German intelligence agents, who regarded his statements as unconvincing. An October 2002 National Intelligence Estimate that concluded Iraq "has" biological weapons was "based almost exclusively on information obtained" from Curveball, according to the report.
- Information about aluminum tubes to be used as centrifuges in a nuclear weapons program were found by the commission to be used for conventional rockets.
- The Niger Yellowcake scandal was due to American intelligence believing "transparently forged documents" purporting to show a contract between the countries. There were "flaws in the letterhead, forged signatures, misspelled words, incorrect titles for individuals and government entities".
- While there were many reports that Curveball was actually the cousin of one of Ahmed Chalabi's top aides, the Commission, while discovering that at least two INC defectors were fabricators, said it was "unable to uncover any evidence that the INC [Iraqi National Congress] or any other organization was directing Curveball."

== Recommendations ==
The report also looked forward, recommending a large number of organizational and structural reforms. Of the 74 recommendations to the President, he fully accepted 69 in a public statement released on June 29, 2005.

The Commission's mission is, in part, "to ensure the most effective counter-proliferation capabilities of the United States and response to the September 11, 2001, terrorist attacks and the ongoing threat of terrorist activity." With regard to Iraq, the commission was meant to "specifically examine the Intelligence Community's intelligence prior to the initiation of Operation Iraqi Freedom and compare it with the findings of the Iraq Survey Group and other relevant agencies or organizations concerning the capabilities, intentions, and activities of Iraq relating to the design, development, manufacture, acquisition, possession, proliferation, transfer, testing, potential or threatened use, or use of Weapons of Mass Destruction and related means of delivery."

== Commission members ==
Commission members are:

- Laurence Silberman, Republican, retired U.S. Court of Appeals judge, Deputy Attorney General under Presidents Richard Nixon and Gerald Ford, Ambassador to Yugoslavia, et al., co-Chairman
- Charles Robb, Democrat, former U.S. Senator from and Governor of Virginia, co-Chairman
- John McCain, Republican, U.S. Senator from Arizona
- Lloyd Cutler, Democrat, former White House counsel to Presidents Jimmy Carter and Bill Clinton. Cutler changed status to "Of Counsel" shortly after the Commission formed.
- Patricia Wald, Democrat, retired judge of the DC Court of Appeals.
- Rick Levin, then-President of Yale University.
- Retired Admiral Bill Studeman, former Deputy Director of the CIA and Director of the NSA.
- Charles M. Vest, former President of MIT
- Henry S. Rowen, former Assistant Secretary of Defense for International Security Affairs, Chairman of the National Intelligence Council, and President of RAND.

The first seven members of the panel were appointed on February 6, 2004, the date of the executive order which created it. The final two members, Vest and Rowen, were appointed on February 13. Vice Admiral John Scott Redd served as the Executive Director for the Commission on the Intelligence Capabilities of the United States Regarding Weapons of Mass Destruction sometimes called the Iraq Intelligence Commission. He also served as the first Director of the National Counterterrorism Center under President George W. Bush and founded and served as the first Commander of the United States Navy Fifth Fleet (COMFIFTHFLT).

Days before the American commission was announced, the government of the United Kingdom, the U.S.'s primary ally during the Iraq War, announced a similar commission to investigate British intelligence, known as the Butler Inquiry or the Butler Review.

The commission was independent and separate from the 9-11 Commission.

== See also ==
- 9/11 Commission
- Commission on the Prevention of WMD proliferation and terrorism
- Iraq and weapons of mass destruction
- Iraq Study Group
- Iraq Survey Group
- Office of Special Plans
- Operation Rockingham
- Senate Report on Pre-war Intelligence on Iraq
- Weapons of Mass Destruction Commission
