= 2003 invasion of Iraq =

Military invasion led by the United States

2003 Invasion of Iraq
- Part of the war on terror and the Iraq War
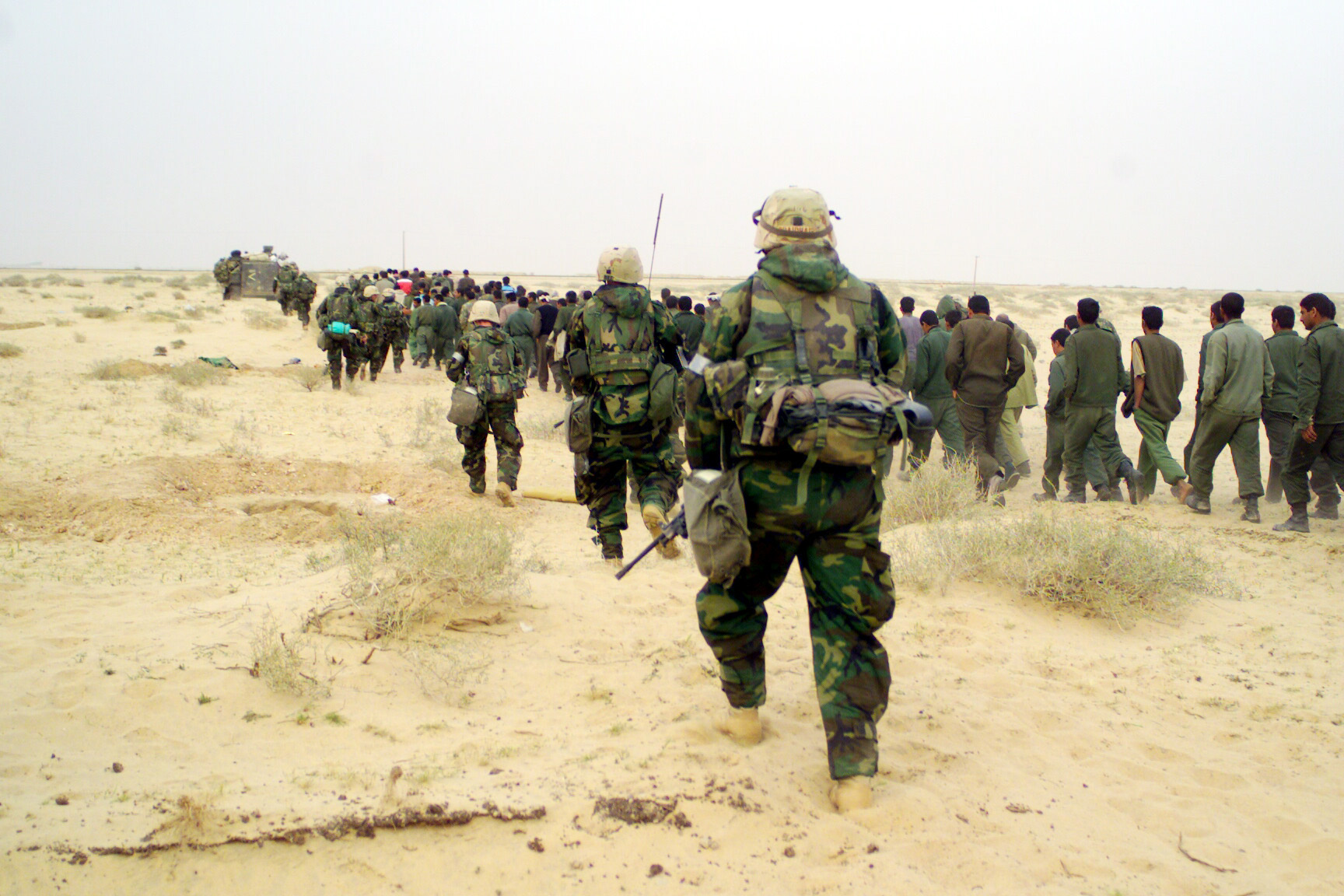
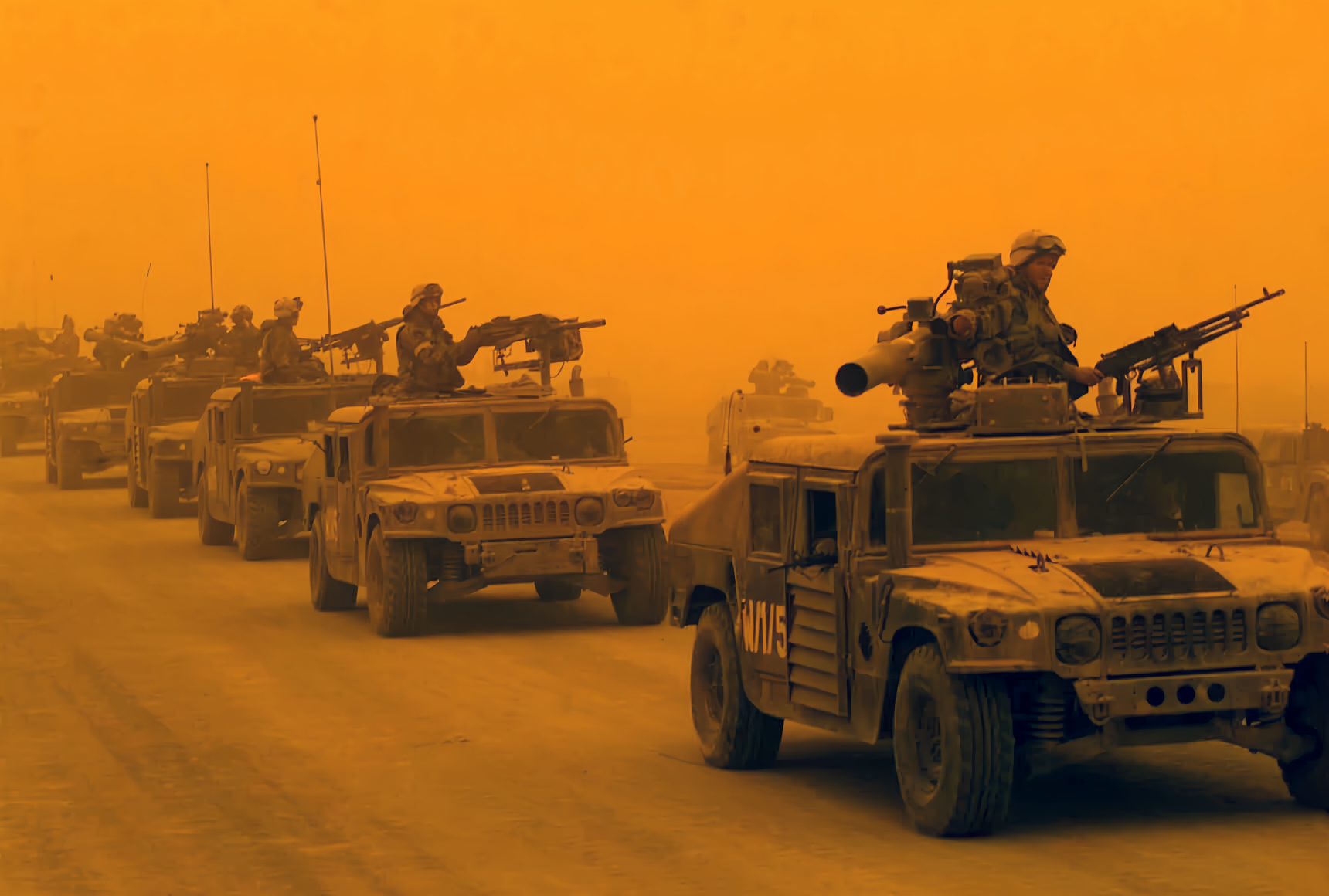
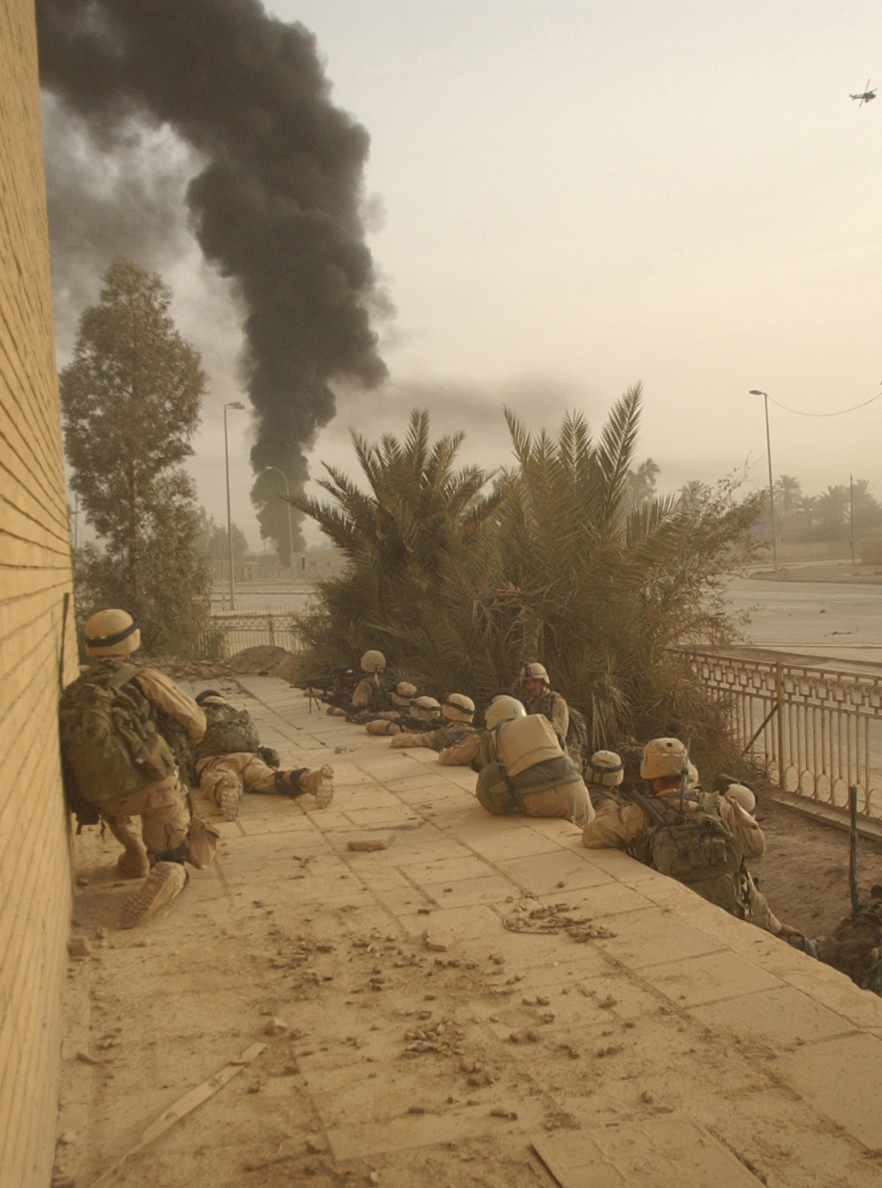
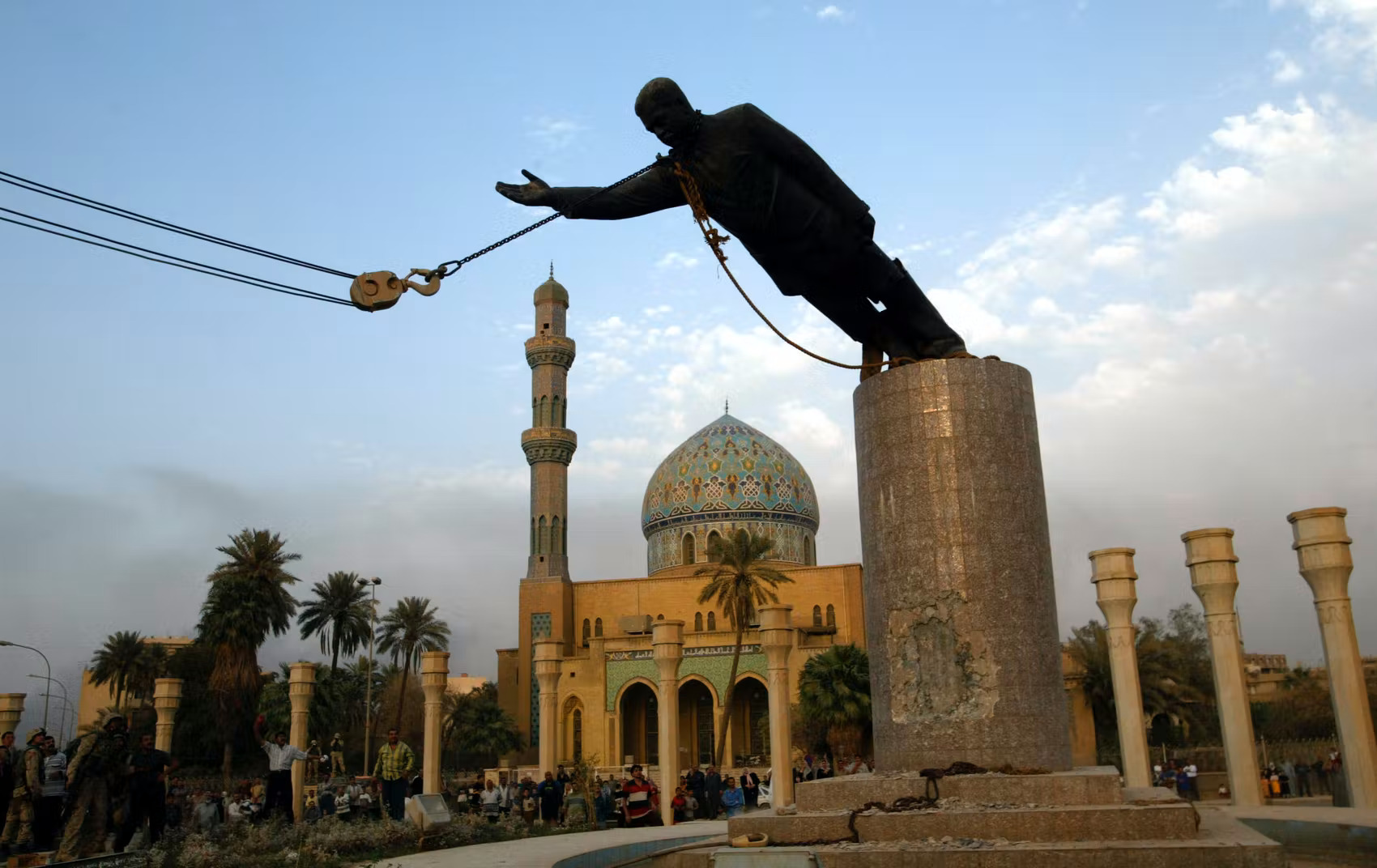
- Clockwise from top-left: American troops from the 2nd Battalion, 1st Marine Regiment, escort Iraqi prisoners of war to a holding area in the desert; American convoy of Humvees in northern Iraq during a sandstorm; Iraqi civilians cheer as American soldiers topple Saddam Hussein's statue in Baghdad's Firdos Square; American troops from the 2nd Battalion, 325th Airborne Infantry Regiment, watch an Iraqi paramilitary's headquarters burn in Samawah
| Date | 20 March – 1 May 2003 (1 month, 1 week and 4 days) |
| Location | Iraq, Kuwait and the Persian Gulf (Note: The conflict occasionally spilled over into Kuwait due to the Iraqi military firing missiles across the international border to attack American and Kuwaiti targets.) |
| Result | Coalition victory |

Belligerents
| Coalition of the willing; United States; United Kingdom; Australia; Poland; Kurdistan Region; KDP; PUK; Iraqi National Congress; Free Iraqi Forces | Ba'athist Iraq; MEK |

Commanders and leaders
| (United States) George W. Bush; (United States) Dick Cheney; (United States) Donald Rumsfeld; (United States) Colin Powell; (United States) Tommy Franks; (United Kingdom) Tony Blair; (United Kingdom) Geoff Hoon; (United Kingdom) Brian Burridge; (Australia) John Howard | (Ba'athist Iraq) Saddam Hussein; (Ba'athist Iraq) Qusay Hussein; (Ba'athist Iraq) Uday Hussein; (Ba'athist Iraq) Abid Hamid Mahmud; (Ba'athist Iraq) Ali Hassan al-Majid; (Ba'athist Iraq) Barzan Ibrahim al-Tikriti; (Ba'athist Iraq) Izzat Ibrahim al-Douri; (Ba'athist Iraq) Ra'ad al-Hamdani; (Ba'athist Iraq) Taha Yassin Ramadan; (Ba'athist Iraq) Tariq Aziz |

Strength
| Total: 589,799: 466,985 personnel; 50,000 troops; 2,000 troops; 194 special forces; 70,000 troops; 620 troops | Total: 1,311,000: Iraqi Armed Forces: 538,000 active; 650,000 reserves; 4,000 tanks; 3,700 APCs and IFVs; 2,300 artillery pieces; 300 combat aircraft; SRG: 12,000; RG: 75,000; Fedayeen Saddam: 30,000; Arab volunteers: 6,000 |

Casualties and losses
| 196+ killed; 551+ wounded; Coalition: 172 killed; (United States) 139; (United Kingdom) 33; (United States) 551 wounded; Peshmerga: 24+ killed | 11,000–45,000 killed; Unknown wounded; 11,000 (4,895–6,370 observed and reported) (Project on Defense Alternatives study); 13,500–45,000 (extrapolated from fatality rates of units serving around Baghdad) |
- Estimated Iraqi civilian fatalities: 7,400 (Iraq Body Count); 3,200–4,300 (Project on Defense Alternatives study)

The 2003 invasion of Iraq (Note: The invasion was codenamed Operation Iraqi Freedom (OIF) by the United States, while Iraqi officials named it the Decisive War (Arabic: معركة الحواسم).) was the first stage of the Iraq War. The invasion began on 20 March 2003 and lasted just over one month, including 26 days of major combat operations. The invasion was conducted by a United States–led coalition of mainly American, British, Australian, and Polish troops.

According to US president George W. Bush and UK prime minister Tony Blair, the coalition aimed to disarm Iraq of weapons of mass destruction (WMDs)—nuclear, chemical, and biological weapons—and "free the Iraqi people" by deposing president Saddam Hussein, in turn ending his "support for terrorism". Before the invasion, United Nations (UN) inspectors in Iraq had found no evidence of Iraqi WMDs; US and British officials claimed they were still hidden, and posed an immediate threat to world peace.

The invasion was strongly opposed by some long-standing US allies, including Canada, France, Germany, and New Zealand. In 2004, UN secretary-general Kofi Annan called the invasion illegal under international law, as a breach of the UN Charter. On 15 February 2003, there were worldwide protests against the anticipated invasion of Iraq, including a rally of three million people in Rome which was the largest anti-war rally in history.

The invasion began with an airstrike on the Presidential Palace in Baghdad on 20 March 2003. The following day, coalition forces launched an incursion into Basra Governorate from their massing point close to the Iraqi–Kuwaiti border. While special forces launched an amphibious assault from the Persian Gulf to secure Basra and the surrounding petroleum fields, the main invasion army occupied southern Iraq, engaging in the Battle of Nasiriyah on 23 March. Massive air strikes across the country and against Iraqi command and control threw the defending army into chaos and prevented an effective resistance. On 26 March, the 173rd Airborne Brigade was airdropped near the northern city of Kirkuk, where they joined forces with Kurdish rebels and fought several actions against the Iraqi Army, to secure the northern part of the country.

The main body of coalition forces continued their drive into the heart of Iraq and were met with little resistance. Most of the Iraqi military was quickly defeated. On 9 April 2003, 22 days after the first day of the invasion, the capital city of Baghdad was captured by coalition forces after the six-day-long Battle of Baghdad. Other operations included the capture and occupation of Kirkuk on 10 April and the attack on and capture of Tikrit on 15 April. Saddam and the Iraqi central leadership went into hiding, as the coalition forces finished occupying the country. On 1 May, Bush declared the "end of major combat operations" in Iraq; this began the occupation phase of the Iraq War, in which coalition forces fought the Iraqi insurgency. Saddam was captured by US forces on 13 December 2003.

== Prelude to the invasion ==
=== Background ===
The Gulf War began in 1990, and ended in 1991 with a ceasefire between the United Nations coalition and Iraq. The U.S. and its allies tried to keep Saddam Hussein in check with military actions such as Operation Southern Watch, by monitoring and controlling some Iraqi airspace, as well as using economic sanctions. Violating the Biological Weapons Convention, Iraq's biological weapons (BW) program began in the early 1980s, with help from the U.S. and European countries reportedly unaware of Iraq's intentions. Details of Iraqi biological and chemical weapons program surfaced after the Gulf War, following investigations by the UN Special Commission (UNSCOM), which had been charged with the post-war disarmament of Iraq. The investigation concluded that the program had not continued after the war. The U.S. and its allies then maintained a policy of "containment" towards Iraq, involving numerous economic sanctions by the UN Security Council (UNSC); the enforcement of Iraqi no-fly zones declared by the U.S. and the UK to protect the Kurds in Iraqi Kurdistan and Shias in the south from aerial attacks by the Iraqi government; and ongoing inspections. Iraqi military helicopters and planes regularly contested the no-fly zones.

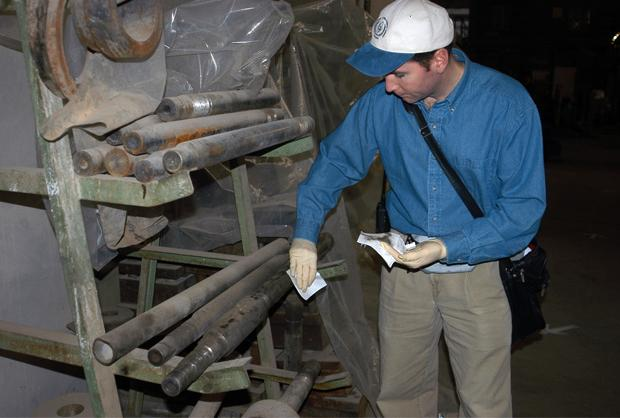
A UN weapons inspector in Iraq, 2002.

In 1998, regime change in Iraq became official U.S. foreign policy with enactment of the Iraq Liberation Act, enacted following the expulsion of UN weapons inspectors months earlier (some had been accused of spying for the U.S.). The act provided $97 million for Iraqi "democratic opposition organizations" to "establish a program to support a transition to democracy in Iraq." This legislation contrasted with the terms set out in UNSC Resolution 687, which focused on weapons and weapons programs and made no mention of regime change. One month later, the U.S. and UK bombed Iraq during Operation Desert Fox, their rationale being to hamper Iraq's ability to produce chemical, biological, and nuclear weapons, but U.S. intelligence personnel also hoped it would help weaken Saddam's grip on power.

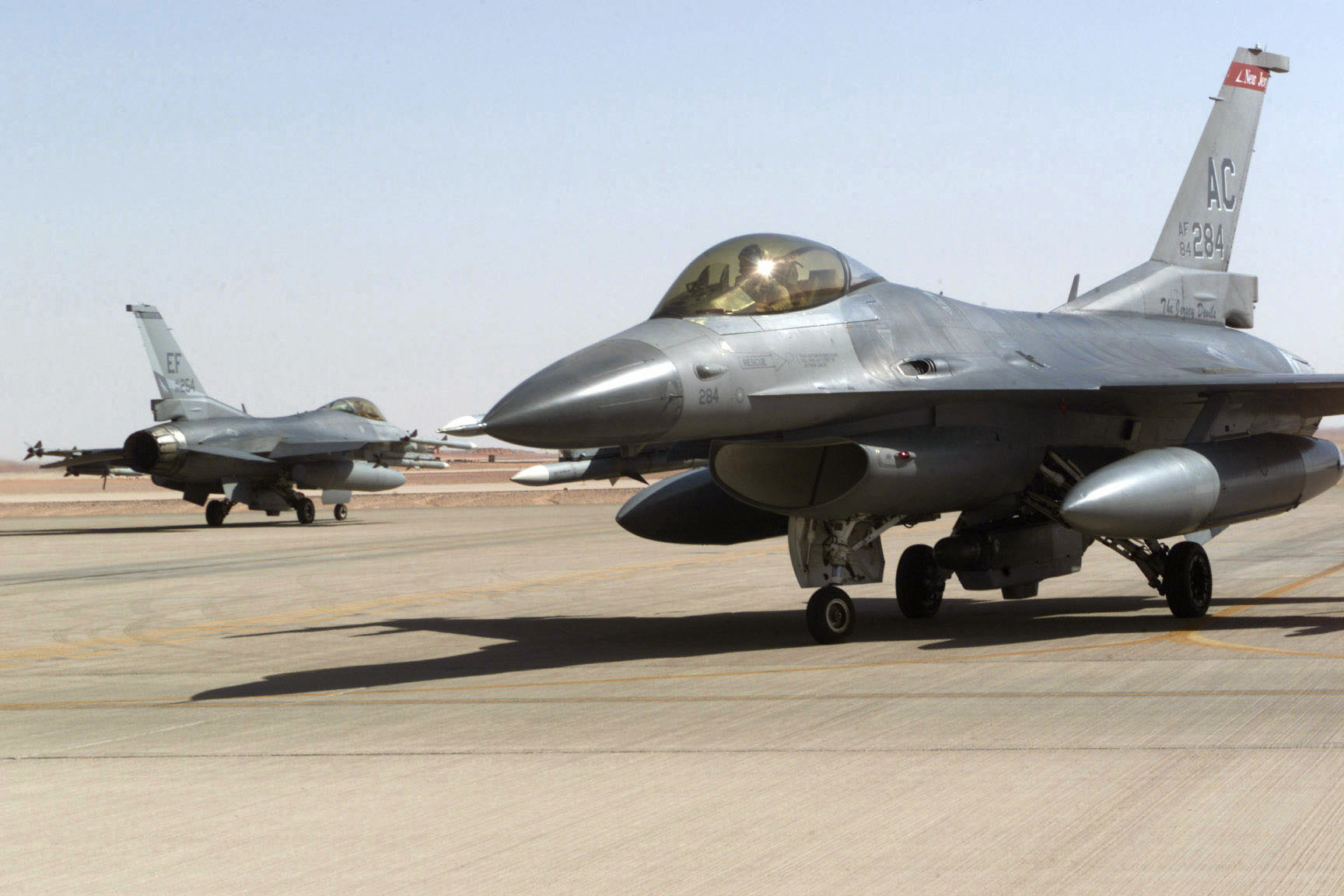
Two U.S. F-16 Fighting Falcons about to depart Prince Sultan Air Base in Saudi Arabia during Operation Southern Watch in 2000

With George W. Bush's inauguration in January 2001, the U.S. moved towards a more aggressive policy toward Iraq. The Republican Party's 2000 campaign platform called for the U.S. to "remove" Saddam. After leaving the Bush administration, Treasury Secretary Paul O'Neill said that an attack on Iraq had been planned since Bush's inauguration, and that the first U.S. National Security Council meeting involved discussion of an invasion. O'Neill later backtracked, saying that these discussions were part of a continuation of foreign policy first put into place by the Clinton administration. Despite the Bush administration's stated interest in invading Iraq, little formal movement towards an invasion occurred until the 11 September attacks (9/11).

== September 11 attacks ==
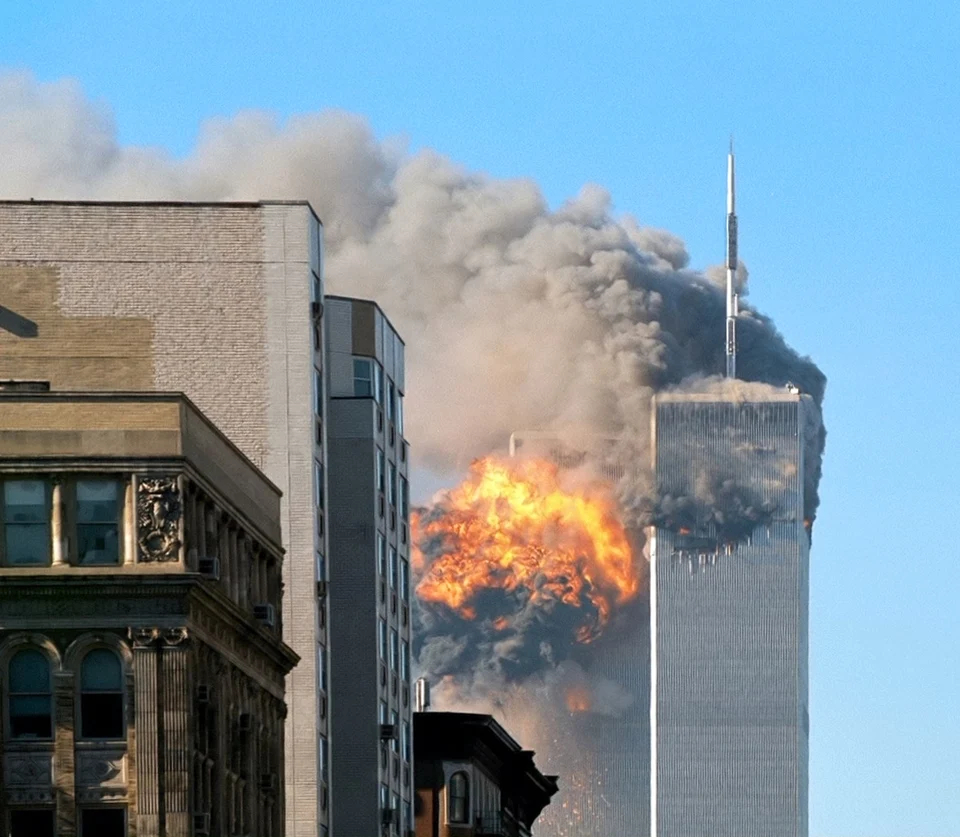
United Airlines Flight 175 striking the South Tower of the World Trade Center on September 11, 2001

On the morning of 11 September 2001, the al-Qaeda militant organization, led by Osama bin Laden, committed four coordinated terrorist attacks on the U.S., using hijacked commercial airliners to crash into major symbols of American economic and military power. Nearly 3,000 people were killed. Messages intercepted by the National Security Agency during the attacks pointed to al-Qaeda's responsibility for them. By mid-afternoon, however, Secretary of Defense Donald Rumsfeld ordered the Pentagon to prepare plans for attacking Iraq. According to aides near him that day, Rumsfeld messaged: "Best info fast. Judge whether good enough hit S.H. [Saddam Hussein] at same time. Not only UBL [Usama bin Laden]". According to the 9/11 Commission Report, "Rumsfeld later explained that at the time, he had been considering either one of them, or perhaps someone else, as the responsible party."

On 12 September, Bush ordered White House counter-terrorism coordinator Richard A. Clarke to investigate possible Iraqi involvement in 9/11. Shocked by the sophistication of the attacks, the administration wondered whether a state sponsor was involved. Clarke's office issued a memo on 18 September that noted wide ideological gaps between Iraq and al-Qaeda, and that only weak anecdotal evidence linked the two. A 21 September briefing to Bush indicated that U.S. intelligence had no evidence linking Saddam to the attacks, and there was "scant credible evidence that Iraq had any significant collaborative ties with al-Qaeda." The PDB wrote off the few contacts that existed between Saddam's government and al-Qaeda as attempts to monitor the group, not work with it.

However, U.S. vice president Dick Cheney and Rumsfeld expressed skepticism toward's the CIA's intelligence. They questioned whether the CIA were competent enough to produce accurate information as the agency underestimated threats and failed to accurately predict events such as the 1979 Iranian Revolution, the 1990 Iraqi invasion of Kuwait, and the 1991 collapse of the Soviet Union. They instead preferred outside analysis, of which information was supplied by the Iraqi National Congress as well as unvetted pieces of intelligence. This information alleged that a highly secretive relationship existed between Saddam and al-Qaeda from 1992, specifically through a series of meetings reportedly involving the Iraqi Intelligence Service (IIS). The rationale for invading Iraq as a response to 9/11 has been widely questioned, as there was no cooperation between Saddam and al-Qaeda.

On 20 September 2001, Bush addressed a joint session of Congress (telecast live to the world), and announced his new "war on terror". This announcement was accompanied by the doctrine of "pre-emptive" military action, later termed the Bush Doctrine. On 21 November, Bush spoke with Rumsfeld and instructed him to conduct a confidential review of OPLAN 1003, the war plan for invading Iraq. Rumsfeld met with General Tommy Franks, the commander of U.S. Central Command (CENTCOM), on 27 November to go over the plans. A record of the meeting includes the question "How start?", listing multiple possible justifications for a U.S.–Iraq War. Some Bush advisers favored an immediate invasion of Iraq, while others advocated building an international coalition and obtaining UN authorization. Bush eventually decided to seek UN authorization, while still reserving the option of invading without it.

General David Petraeus recalled in an interview his experience during the time before the invasion, stating that "When we were getting ready for what became the invasion of Iraq, the prevailing wisdom was that we were going to have a long, hard fight to Baghdad, and it was really going to be hard to take Baghdad. The road to deployment, which was a very compressed road for the 101st Airborne Division, started with a seminar on military operations in urban terrain, because that was viewed as the decisive event in the takedown of the regime in Iraq — that and finding and destroying the weapons of mass destruction."

=== Diplomatic preparations ===
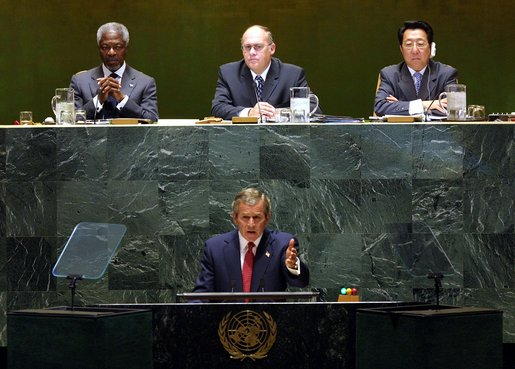
George W. Bush addressing the UN General Assembly on 12 September 2002, outline the U.S. case against Iraq

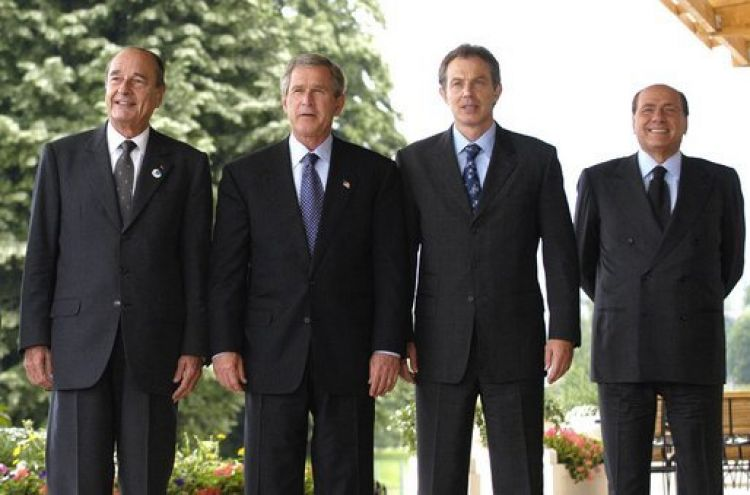
From left: leaders Jacques Chirac (France), Bush, Tony Blair (UK) and Silvio Berlusconi (Italy) at the G8 Summit at Evian, France. Chirac opposed the invasion; the other three leaders supported it.

While there had been some earlier talk of action against Iraq, the Bush administration waited until September 2002 to call for action, with White House Chief of Staff Andrew Card saying, "From a marketing point of view, you don't introduce new products in August." Bush began formally making his case to the international community for an invasion of Iraq in his 12 September address to the UN General Assembly. Also that day, Benjamin Netanyahu testified before the U.S. Congress, using expert testimony to encourage an invasion, and stating there was "no question" that Saddam was working on WMDs.

The UK agreed with the U.S. actions, while France and Germany were critical of plans to invade Iraq, arguing instead for continued diplomacy and weapons inspections. After considerable debate, the UNSC adopted a compromise resolution, UNSC Resolution 1441, which authorized the resumption of weapons inspections and promised "serious consequences" for non-compliance. UNSC members France and Russia made clear that they did not consider these consequences to include the use of force to overthrow the Iraqi government. Both the U.S. ambassador to the UN, John Negroponte, and the UK ambassador, Jeremy Greenstock, publicly confirmed this reading of the resolution, assuring that Resolution 1441 provided no "automaticity" or "hidden triggers" for an invasion without further consultation of the UNSC.

Resolution 1441 gave Iraq "a final opportunity to comply with its disarmament obligations" and set up inspections by the UN Monitoring, Verification and Inspection Commission (UNMOVIC) and the International Atomic Energy Agency (IAEA). Saddam accepted the resolution on 13 November and inspectors returned to Iraq under the direction of UNMOVIC chairman Hans Blix and IAEA Director-General Mohamed ElBaradei. As of February 2003, the IAEA "found no evidence or plausible indication of the revival of a nuclear weapons program in Iraq"; the IAEA concluded that certain items which could have been used in nuclear enrichment centrifuges, such as aluminum tubes, were in fact intended for other uses. UNMOVIC "did not find evidence of the continuation or resumption" of WMD programs, or significant quantities of proscribed items. UNMOVIC did supervise the destruction of a small number of empty chemical rocket warheads, 50 liters of mustard gas that had been declared by Iraq and sealed by UNSCOM in 1998, and laboratory quantities of a mustard gas precursor, along with about 50 Al-Samoud missiles of a design that Iraq stated did not exceed the permitted 150 km range, but which had traveled up to 183 km in tests. Shortly before the invasion, UNMOVIC stated that it would take "months" to verify Iraqi compliance with resolution 1441.

In October 2002, the U.S. Congress passed the Iraq Resolution, which authorized the President to "use any means necessary" against Iraq. Americans polled in January 2003 widely favored further diplomacy over an invasion. Later that year, however, Americans began to agree with Bush's plan. The U.S. government engaged in an elaborate domestic public relations campaign to market the war to its citizens. Americans overwhelmingly believed Saddam did have WMDs: 85% said so, even though the inspectors had not uncovered those weapons. Of those who thought Iraq had weapons sequestered somewhere, about half responded that said weapons would not be found in combat. By February 2003, 64% of Americans supported taking military action to remove Saddam from power.

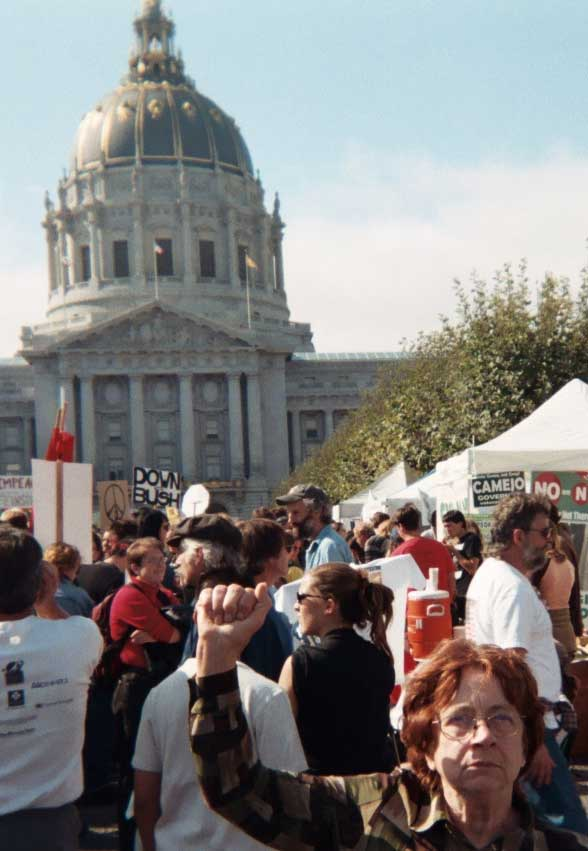
60,000–200,000 protesters of various ages demonstrated in San Francisco, 15 February 2003

In the 2003 State of the Union address, Bush said "we know that Iraq, in the late 1990s, had several mobile biological weapons labs". On 5 February, U.S. secretary of state Colin Powell addressed the UNSC, continuing U.S. efforts to gain UN authorization for an invasion. His presentation contained a computer-generated image of a "mobile biological weapons laboratory". However, this information was based on claims of Rafid Ahmed Alwan al-Janabi, codenamed "Curveball", an Iraqi emigrant living in Germany who later admitted that his claims had been false.

Powell falsely alleged that Iraq had ties to al-Qaeda. As a follow-up to the presentation, the U.S., UK, Poland, Italy, Australia, Denmark, Japan, and Spain proposed a resolution authorizing the use of force in Iraq, but Canada, France, Germany, and Russia strongly urged continued diplomacy. Facing a losing vote as well as a likely veto from France and Russia; the aforementioned countries eventually withdrew their resolution.

Opposition to the invasion coalesced in the worldwide 15 February 2003 anti-war protest that attracted between six and ten million people in more than 800 cities, the largest such protest in human history.

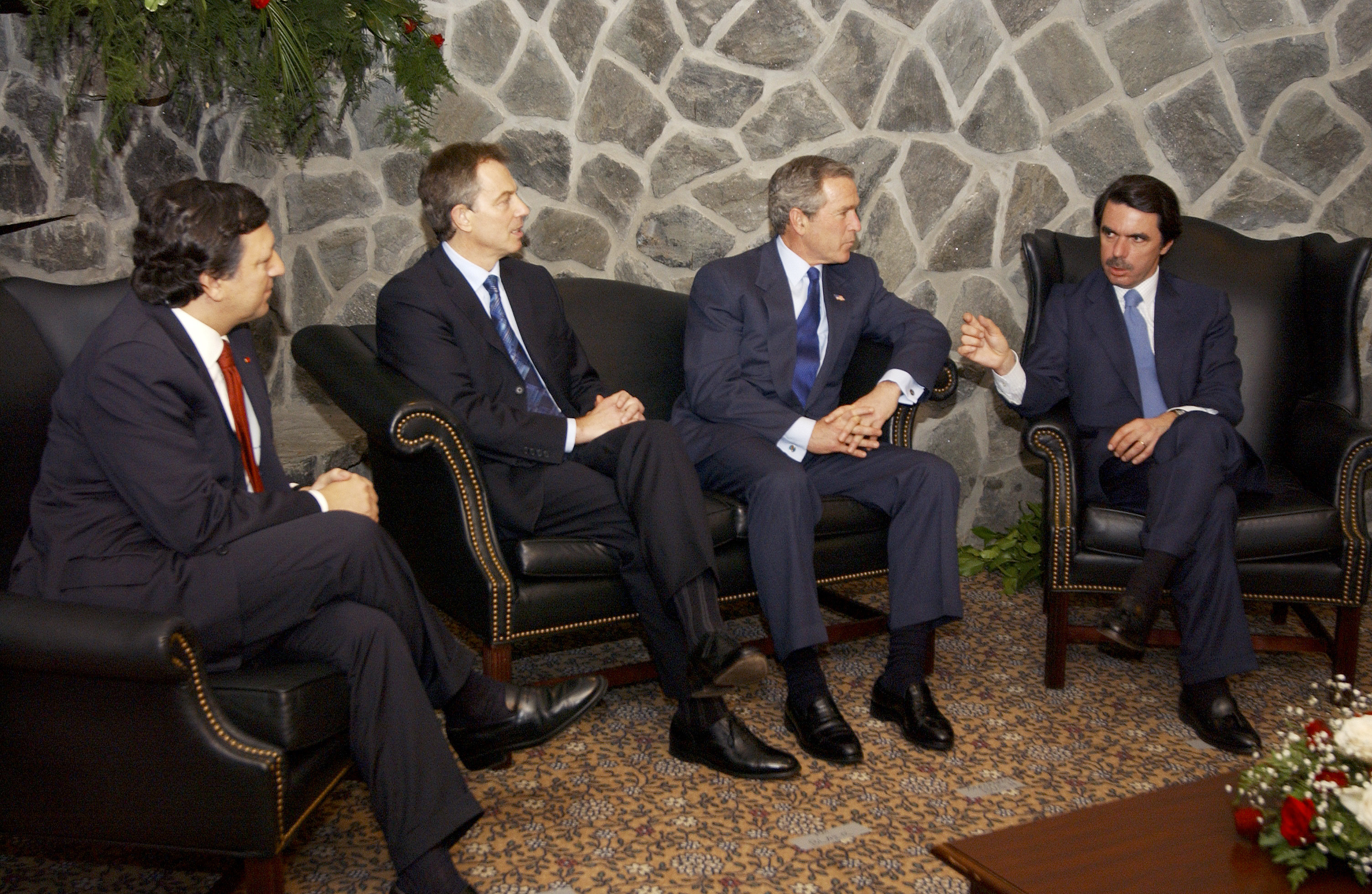
José Manuel Durão Barroso, Blair, Bush, and José María Aznar on 16 March 2003 at the Azores Summit

On 16 March 2003, Spanish Prime Minister José María Aznar, UK Prime Minister Tony Blair, Bush, and Prime Minister of Portugal José Manuel Durão Barroso as host met in the Azores to discuss the invasion of Iraq and Spain's potential involvement in the war, as well as the beginning of the invasion. This encounter was extremely controversial in Spain, even now remaining a very sensitive point for the Aznar government. In 2004, Madrid suffered the worst terrorist attack in Europe since the Lockerbie bombing, motivated by Spain's decision to participate in the war, prompting some Spaniards to accuse the Prime Minister of being responsible.

In March 2003, the U.S., UK, Poland, Australia, Spain, Denmark preparing for the invasion of Iraq, with a host of public relations and military moves. In his 17 March address to the nation, Bush demanded that Saddam and his two sons, Uday and Qusay, surrender and leave Iraq, giving them a 48-hour deadline.

The UK House of Commons held a debate on going to war on 18 March where the government motion was approved 412 to 149. The vote was a key moment in the history of the Blair administration, as the number of government MPs who rebelled against the vote was the greatest since the repeal of the Corn Laws in 1846. Three government ministers resigned in protest at the war, John Denham, Lord Hunt of Kings Heath, and the then Leader of the House of Commons Robin Cook. In a passionate speech to the House of Commons after his resignation, he said, "What has come to trouble me is the suspicion that if the 'hanging chads' of Florida had gone the other way and Al Gore had been elected, we would not now be about to commit British troops to action in Iraq." During the debate, it was stated that the Attorney General had advised that the war was legal under previous UN Resolutions.

== Last diplomatic efforts ==
In December 2002, a representative of Iraqi General Tahir Jalil Habbush al-Tikriti, contacted former CIA Counterterrorism Department head Vincent Cannistraro, and stated that Saddam "knew there was a campaign to link him to 11 September and prove he had [WMDs]". Cannistraro added that "the Iraqis were prepared to satisfy these concerns. I reported the conversation to senior levels of the state department and I was told to stand aside and they would handle it." Cannistraro stated that the offers made were all "killed" by the Bush administration because they allowed Saddam to remain in power, an outcome viewed as unacceptable. It has been suggested that Saddam was prepared to go into exile if allowed to keep U.S.$1 billion.

Egyptian president Hosni Mubarak's national security advisor, Osama El-Baz, sent a message to the U.S. State Department that the Iraqis wanted to discuss the accusations that the country had WMDs and ties with al-Qaeda. Iraq also attempted to reach the U.S. through the Syrian, French, German, and Russian intelligence services.

In January 2003, Lebanese-American Imad Hage met with U.S. Department of Defense official Michael Maloof. Hage, a resident of Beirut, had been recruited by the department to assist in the war on terror. He reported that Mohammed Nassif, a close aide to Syrian president Bashar al-Assad, had expressed frustrations about the difficulties of Syria contacting the U.S., and had attempted to use him as an intermediary. Maloof arranged for Hage to meet with Richard Perle, then head of the Defense Policy Board.

In January 2003, Hage met with Iraqi intelligence official Hassan al-Obeidi. Al-Obeidi told Hage that Baghdad did not understand why they were targeted and that they had no WMDs. He then made the offer for Washington to send in 2000 FBI agents to confirm this. He additionally offered petroleum concessions but stopped short of having Saddam give up power, instead suggesting that elections could be held in two years. Later, al-Obeidi suggested that Hage travel to Baghdad for talks; he accepted.

Later that month, Hage met with General Habbush and Iraqi Deputy Prime Minister Tariq Aziz. He was offered top priority to U.S. firms in oil and mining rights, UN-supervised elections, U.S. inspections (with up to 5,000 inspectors), to have al-Qaeda agent Abdul Rahman Yasin (in Iraqi custody since 1994) handed over as a sign of good faith, and to give "full support for any U.S. plan" in the Israeli–Palestinian peace process. They also wished to meet with high-ranking U.S. officials. On 19 February, Hage faxed Maloof his report of the trip. Maloof reports having brought the proposal to Jaymie Duran. The Pentagon denies that either Wolfowitz or Rumsfeld, Duran's bosses, were aware of the plan.

On 21 February, Maloof informed Duran in an email that Richard Perle wished to meet with Hage and the Iraqis if the Pentagon would clear it. Duran responded "Mike, working this. Keep this close hold." On 7 March, Perle met with Hage in Knightsbridge, and stated that he wanted to pursue the matter further with people in Washington, D.C. (both have acknowledged the meeting). A few days later, he informed Hage that Washington refused to let him meet with Habbush to discuss the offer (Hage stated that Perle's response was "that the consensus in Washington was it was a no-go"). Perle told The Times, "The message was 'Tell them that we will see them in Baghdad.′"

== Rationale ==
According to Tommy Franks, the objectives of the invasion were to:

- Depose's Saddam government
- Identify, isolate, and eliminate Iraqi WMDs
- Find, capture, and drive out terrorists from Iraq
- Collect intelligence related to terrorist networks, and to "the global network" of WMDs
- End sanctions
- Deliver humanitarian support to the Iraqi people, including the displaced
- Secure Iraq's oil fields and resources, "which belong to the Iraqi people"
- Help the Iraqi people "create conditions for a transition to a representative self-government"

Throughout 2002, the Bush administration insisted that removing Saddam from power to restore international peace and security was a major goal. The principal stated justifications for this policy of "regime change" were that Iraq's continuing production of WMDs and known ties to terrorist organizations, as well as Iraq's continued violations of UNSC resolutions, amounted to a threat to the U.S. and the world community.

Bush, speaking in October 2002, said that "The stated policy of the United States is regime change. ... However, if Saddam were to meet all the conditions of the United Nations, the conditions that I have described very clearly in terms that everybody can understand, that in itself will signal the regime has changed." Citing reports from certain intelligence sources, Bush stated on 6 March 2003 that he believed that Saddam was not complying with UN Resolution 1441.

=== Weapons of mass destruction ===
The main allegations were: that Saddam possessed or was attempting to produce WMDs, which he had used in places such as Halabja, possessed, and made efforts to acquire, particularly considering two previous attacks on Baghdad nuclear weapons production facilities by both Iran and Israel which were alleged to have postponed weapons development progress; and, further, that he had ties to terrorists, specifically al-Qaeda.

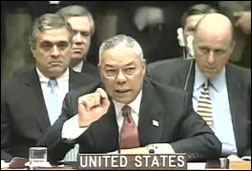
Colin Powell holding a model vial of anthrax during his presentation to the UN Security Council on 5 February 2003

The Bush administration's overall rationale for the invasion of Iraq was presented in detail by Powell to the UNSC. In summary, he stated,

We know that Saddam Hussein is determined to keep his weapons of mass destruction; he's determined to make more. Given Saddam Hussein's history of aggression ... given what we know of his terrorist associations and given his determination to exact revenge on those who oppose him, should we take the risk that he will not some day use these weapons at a time and the place and in the manner of his choosing at a time when the world is in a much weaker position to respond? The United States will not and cannot run that risk to the American people. Leaving Saddam Hussein in possession of weapons of mass destruction for a few more months or years is not an option, not in a post–September 11 world.

In September 2002, Blair stated that "Regime change in Iraq would be a wonderful thing. That is not the purpose of our action; our purpose is to disarm Iraq of weapons of mass destruction..." In November of that year, Blair further stated that, "So far as our objective, it is disarmament, not regime change – that is our objective. Now I happen to believe the regime of Saddam is a very brutal and repressive regime, I think it does enormous damage to the Iraqi people ... so I have got no doubt Saddam is very bad for Iraq, but on the other hand I have got no doubt either that the purpose of our challenge from the United Nations is the disarmament of weapons of mass destruction, it is not regime change."

On 31 January 2003, Bush again reiterated that the single trigger for the invasion would be Iraq's failure to disarm, "Saddam Hussein must understand that if he does not disarm, for the sake of peace, we, along with others, will go disarm Saddam Hussein." As late as 25 February, it was still the official line that the only cause of invasion would be a failure to disarm. As Blair made clear in a statement to the House of Commons, "I detest his regime. But even now he can save it by complying with the UN's demand. Even now, we are prepared to go the extra step to achieve disarmament peacefully."

In September 2002, the Bush administration said attempts by Iraq to acquire thousands of high-strength aluminum tubes pointed to a clandestine program to make enriched uranium for nuclear bombs. Powell referred to the tubes in his UNSC presentation. A report released by the Institute for Science and International Security in 2002, however, reported that it was highly unlikely that the tubes could be used to enrich uranium. Powell later admitted that his presentation had inaccuracies, based on sourcing that was wrong, and in some cases "deliberately misleading."

The Bush administration asserted that the Saddam government had sought to purchase yellowcake uranium from Niger. On 7 March 2003, the U.S. submitted intelligence documents as evidence to the International Atomic Energy Agency. These documents were dismissed by the IAEA as forgeries, with the concurrence in that judgment of outside experts. At the time, an American official stated that the evidence was submitted to the IAEA without knowledge of its provenance and characterized any mistakes as "more likely due to incompetence not malice".

Since the invasion, the U.S. government statements concerning Iraqi weapons programs and links to al-Qaeda have been discredited, though chemical weapons were found in Iraq during the occupation period. While the debate of whether Iraq intended to develop chemical, biological, and nuclear weapons in the future remains open, no WMDs have been found in Iraq since the invasion despite comprehensive inspections lasting more than 18 months. In Cairo, on 24 February 2001, Powell had predicted as much, saying, "[Saddam] has not developed any significant capability with respect to weapons of mass destruction. He is unable to project conventional power against his neighbours."

=== Connection to terrorists ===
Another justification included the alleged connection between Saddam's and that of terrorist organizations such as al-Qaeda.

While it never made an explicit connection between Iraq and 9/11, the Bush administration repeatedly insinuated a link, thereby creating a false impression for the U.S. public. Grand jury testimony from al-Qaeda's 1993 World Trade Center bombing trials cited numerous direct connections between the bombers to Hussein's government. The Iraqi National Congress alleged that Saddam had been collaborating with al-Qaeda since 1992 via the Iraqi Intelligence Service (IIS). For example, The Washington Post has noted that,

While not explicitly declaring Iraqi culpability in [9/11], administration officials did, at various times, imply a link. In late 2001, Cheney said it was "pretty well confirmed" that attack mastermind Mohamed Atta had met with a senior Iraqi intelligence official. Later, Cheney called Iraq the "geographic base of the terrorists who had us under assault now for many years, but most especially on 9/11."

Steven Kull, director of the Program on International Policy Attitudes (PIPA), observed in March 2003 that the administration "has succeeded in creating a sense that there is some connection" between 9/11 and Saddam. This was after a New York Times/CBS poll showed that 45% of Americans believed Saddam was "personally involved" in the attacks. The Christian Science Monitor observed at the time, while "[s]ources knowledgeable about U.S. intelligence say there is no evidence that Saddam played a role in 9/11, nor that he has been or is currently aiding al-Qaeda. ... the White House appears to be encouraging this false impression, as it seeks to maintain American support for a possible war against Iraq and demonstrate seriousness of purpose to Saddam's regime." The CSM went on to report that, while polling data collected "right after" 9/11 showed that only 3% mentioned Iraq or Saddam, attitudes "had been transformed" by January 2003, with a Knight Ridder poll showing that 44% of Americans believed "most" or "some" of the 9/11 hijackers were Iraqi citizens.

The BBC writes that, while Bush "never directly accused the former Iraqi leader of having a hand in" 9/11, he "repeatedly associated the two in keynote addresses" delivered since 9/11, adding that "senior members of his administration have similarly conflated the two." For instance, Powell in February 2003 stated that "We've learned that Iraq has trained al-Qaeda members in bomb-making and poisons and deadly gases. And we know that after September 11, Saddam Hussein's regime gleefully celebrated the terrorist attacks on America." The BBC noted the results of a recent poll which suggested that 70% of Americans believe Saddam "was personally involved" in 9/11.

In September 2003, The Boston Globe reported that "Cheney, anxious to defend the White House foreign policy amid ongoing violence in Iraq, stunned intelligence analysts and even members of his own administration this week by failing to dismiss a widely discredited claim: that Saddam Hussein might have played a role" in 9/11. In 2004, U.S. presidential candidate John Kerry alleged that Cheney was continuing "to intentionally mislead the American public" by linking between Saddam and 9/11 "in an attempt to make the invasion of Iraq part of the global war on terror."

Since the invasion, assertions of operational links between Iraq and al-Qaeda have largely been discredited by the intelligence community, and Powell himself later admitted he had no proof of it.

=== Iraqi drones ===
In October 2002, a few days before the U.S. Senate vote on the Authorization for Use of Military Force Against Iraq Resolution, about 75 senators were told in closed session that Iraq had the means of delivering biological and chemical WMDs by unmanned aerial vehicle (UAV) drones that could be launched from ships off the U.S.' East Coast to attack cities on the coast. Powell suggested in his 2003 UN presentation that UAVs were transported out of Iraq and could be launched against the U.S.

In actuality, Iraq had no offensive UAV fleet or any capability of putting UAVs on ships. Iraq's UAV fleet consisted of less than a handful of outdated Czech training drones. At the time, there was a large dispute within the intelligence community whether the CIA's conclusions about the UAV fleet were accurate. The U.S. Air Force denied outright that Iraq had any offensive UAV capabilities.

=== Human rights ===
Additional justifications used at various times included Iraqi violation of UN resolutions, the Iraqi government's repression of its citizens, and Iraqi violations of the 1991 ceasefire.

As evidence supporting American and British claims about Iraqi WMDs and links to terrorism weakened, some supporters of the invasion have increasingly shifted their justification to the human rights violations of the Saddam government. Leading human rights groups such as Human Rights Watch have argued, however, that they believe human rights concerns were never a central justification for the invasion, nor do they believe that military intervention was justifiable on humanitarian grounds, most significantly because "the killing in Iraq at the time was not of the exceptional nature that would justify such intervention."

== Legality of invasion ==
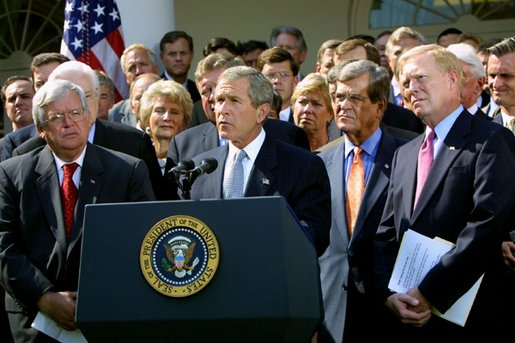
Bush next to leaders of the House and Senate on 2 October 2002, announcing the Authorization for Use of Military Force Against Iraq Resolution

=== U.S. domestic law ===
The Authorization for Use of Military Force Against Iraq Resolution of 2002 was passed by Congress with Republicans voting 98% in favor in the Senate, and 97% in favor in the House. Democrats supported the joint resolution 58% and 39% in the Senate and House respectively. The resolution asserted the authorization by the U.S. Constitution and Congress for Bush to fight anti-American terrorism. Citing the Iraq Liberation Act, the resolution reiterated that it should be the policy of the U.S. to depose Saddam's government and promote a democratic replacement.

The resolution "supported" and "encouraged" diplomatic efforts by Bush to "strictly enforce, through the UN Security Council, all relevant Security Council resolutions regarding Iraq" and "obtain prompt and decisive action by the Security Council to ensure that Iraq abandons its strategy of delay, evasion, and noncompliance, and promptly and strictly complies with all relevant Security Council resolutions regarding Iraq." It authorized Bush to use the U.S. Armed Forces "as he determines to be necessary and appropriate", to "defend [American] national security ... against the continuing threat posed by Iraq".

=== International law ===
The legality of the invasion of Iraq under international law has been challenged since its inception on a number of fronts, and several prominent supporters of the invasion in all the invading states have publicly and privately cast doubt on its legality. It has been argued by the U.S. and UK that the invasion was fully legal because authorization was implied by the UNSC. International legal experts, including the International Commission of Jurists, a group of 31 leading Canadian law professors, and the U.S.-based Lawyers Committee on Nuclear Policy, have denounced this rationale.

On 20 November 2003, The Guardian alleged that Richard Perle, a senior member of the administration's Defense Policy Board Advisory Committee, conceded that the invasion was illegal, but still justified.

The UNSC passed nearly 60 resolutions on Iraq and Kuwait since Iraq's invasion of Kuwait. The most relevant to this issue is 1990's Resolution 678, authorizing "member states co-operating with the Government of Kuwait ... to use all necessary means" to (1) implement UNSC Resolution 660 and other resolutions calling for the end of Iraq's occupation of Kuwait, and withdrawal of Iraqi forces from Kuwaiti territory and (2) "restore international peace and security in the area." Resolution 678 has not been rescinded or nullified by succeeding resolutions. and Iraq was not alleged after 1991 to invade Kuwait or to threaten to do so.

Resolution 1441 was most prominent during the run-up to the war and formed the main backdrop for Powell's UNSC address. According to an independent commission created the Netherlands, Resolution 1441 "cannot reasonably be interpreted as authorising individual member states to use military force to compel Iraq to comply with the Security Council's resolutions." Accordingly, the Dutch commission concluded that the 2003 invasion violated international law.

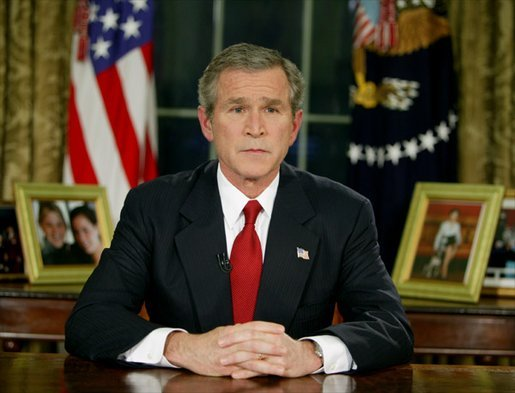
Bush addresses the American public on 20 March 2003, announcing the beginning of Operation Iraqi Freedom.

At the same time, U.S. officials advanced a parallel legal argument using the earlier resolutions, which authorized force in response to Iraq's 1990 invasion of Kuwait. Under this reasoning, by failing to disarm and submit to weapons inspections, Iraq was in violation of UNSC Resolutions 660 and 678, and the U.S. could legally compel Iraq's compliance through military means.

Critics and proponents of the legal rationale based on the UN resolutions argue that the legal right to determine how to enforce its resolutions lies with the UNSC alone, not with individual nations and therefore the invasion of Iraq was not legal under international law, and in direct violation of Article 2(4) of the UN Charter.

In 2006, Luis Moreno Ocampo, the lead prosecutor for the International Criminal Court, reported that he had received 240 separate communications regarding the legality of the war, many of which concerned British participation in the invasion. In a letter addressed to the complainants, Moreno Ocampo explained that he could only consider issues related to conduct during the war and not to its underlying legality as a possible crime of aggression because no provision had yet been adopted which "defines the crime and sets out the conditions under which the Court may exercise jurisdiction with respect to it." In 2007, Moreno Ocampo encouraged Iraq to sign up with the court so that it could bring cases related to alleged war crimes.

In 2007, U.S. Congressman Dennis Kucinich announced U.S. House Resolution 333 and three articles of impeachment against Cheney. He charged Cheney with manipulating evidence for Iraqi WMDs, deceiving the public about Iraq's connection to al-Qaeda, and threatening aggression against Iran in violation of the UN Charter.

== Military aspects ==
=== Multilateral support ===
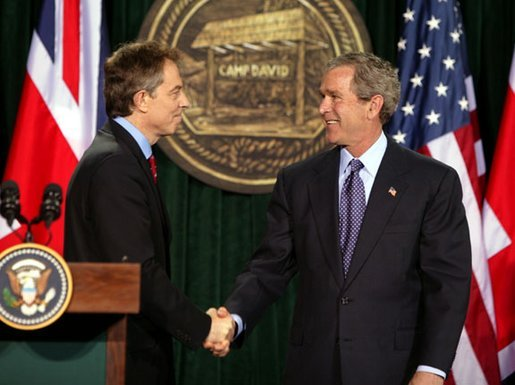
Blair and Bush at Camp David in March 2003

In November 2002, Bush declared that, "should [Saddam] choose not to disarm, the United States will lead a coalition of the willing to disarm him." Thereafter, the Bush administration briefly used the term coalition of the willing to refer to the countries who supported, militarily or verbally, the military action in Iraq and subsequent military presence in post-invasion Iraq since 2003. The original list prepared in March 2003 included 49 members. Of those 49, only six besides the U.S. contributed troops to the invasion force (the UK, Australia, Poland, Spain, Portugal, and Denmark), and 33 provided some number of troops to support the occupation after the invasion was complete. Six members have no military, meaning that they withheld troops completely.

=== Invasion force ===
A CENTCOM report indicated that as of 30 April 2003, 466,985 U.S. personnel were deployed for the invasion:

- Ground forces: 336,797
  - Army, 233,342
  - Army Reserve, 10,683
  - Army National Guard, 8,866
  - Marines, 74,405
  - Marine Reserve, 9,501
- Air forces: 64,246
  - Air Force, 54,955
  - Air Force Reserve, 2,084
  - Air National Guard, 7,207
- Naval forces: 63,352
  - Navy, 61,296
    - Coast Guard: 681
  - Navy Reserve, 2,056

Approximately 200,194 troops—148,000 American, 50,000 British, 2,000 Australian, and 194 Polish (GROM special forces)—were sent to Kuwait for the invasion. The invasion force was also supported by Iraqi Kurdish Peshmerga fighters, estimated to number upwards of 70,000. In the latter stages of the invasion, 620 troops of the Iraqi National Congress opposition group were deployed to southern Iraq.

Canada discreetly contributed some military resources towards the campaign, such as personnel from the Royal Canadian Air Force who crewed American planes on missions in Iraq to train with the platforms, and eleven Canadian aircrew who manned AWACS aircraft. The Canadian Armed Forces had ships, planes, and 1,200 Royal Canadian Navy personnel at the mouth of the Persian Gulf to help support Operation Enduring Freedom, and a secret U.S. briefing cable noted that despite public promises by Canadian officials that these assets would not be used in support of the war in Iraq, "they will also be available to provide escort services in the Straits and will otherwise be discreetly useful to the military effort." However, the Department of National Defence issued an order to naval commanders to not do anything in support of the American-led operation, and it is not known whether this order was ever broken. Canadian official Eugene Lang stated that it was "quite possible" that Canadian forces indirectly supported the American operation. According to Lang, Canada's military strongly advocated to be involved in the Iraq War instead of the war in Afghanistan, and Canada mainly decided to keep its assets in the Gulf to maintain good relations with America. After the invasion, Canadian Brigadier General Walter Natynczyk served as Deputy Commanding General of the Multi-National Corps in occupied Iraq.

Plans to open a second front in the north were severely hampered when Turkey refused the use of its territory for such purposes. In response to Turkey's decision, the U.S. dropped several thousand paratroopers from the 173rd Airborne Brigade into northern Iraq, a number significantly less than the 15,000-strong 4th Infantry Division that the U.S. originally planned to deploy to the northern front.

=== Defending force ===
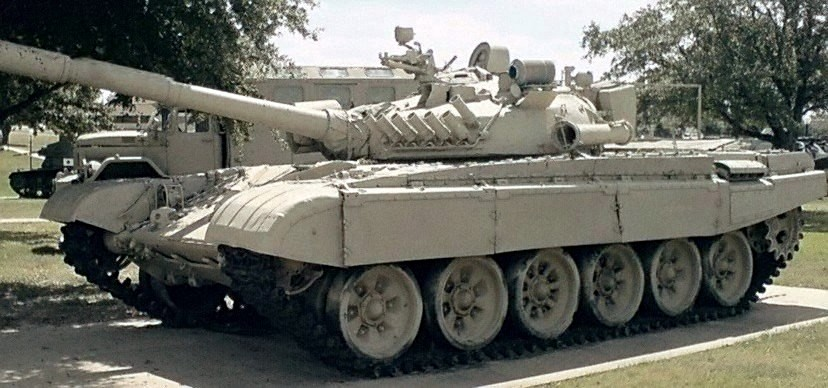
T-72 Lion of Babylon (Asad Babil)

The number of personnel in the Iraqi military before the war was uncertain, but it was believed to have been poorly equipped. The International Institute for Strategic Studies estimated the numbers: the Iraqi Armed Forces at 389,000 (Ground Forces 350,000, Air Force 20,000, Air Defense 17,000, and Navy 2,000), the paramilitary Fedayeen Saddam at 44,000, Republican Guard at 80,000, and reserves at 650,000.

Another estimate numbers the Army at 280,000 to 350,000, the Republican Guard at 50,000 to 80,000, and Fedayeen Saddam at 20,000 and 40,000. There were an estimated thirteen infantry divisions, ten mechanized and armored divisions, as well as some special forces units. The Iraqi Air Force and Navy played a negligible role in the conflict.

During the invasion, foreign volunteers traveled to Iraq from Syria and took part in the fighting, usually commanded by the Fedayeen Saddam. It is not known for certain how many foreign fighters fought in Iraq in 2003, however, intelligence officers of the U.S. First Marine Division estimated that 50% of all Iraqi combatants in central Iraq were foreigners.

In addition, the Kurdish Islamist militant group Ansar al-Islam controlled a small section of northern Iraq in an area outside Saddam's control. Ansar al-Islam had been fighting against secular Kurdish forces since 2001. At the time of the invasion they fielded about 600 to 800 fighters. Ansar al-Islam was led by the Jordanian-born militant Abu Musab al-Zarqawi, who would later become an important leader in the Iraqi insurgency. Ansar al-Islam was driven out of Iraq in late March by a joint American-Kurdish force during Operation Viking Hammer.

=== Military equipment ===
==== Depleted uranium ====
According to information provided to the Dutch Ministry of Defence by American forces, it is estimated that more than 300,000 depleted uranium rounds were fired during the invasion, many in or near populated areas of Iraq, including Samawah, Nasiriyah, and Basra, the vast majority by American forces. In the information, the American forces provided the Dutch Ministry of Defense with the GPS coordinates of the DU rounds, along with a list of targets and numbers fired. Then, the Dutch Ministry of Defence released the data to Dutch peace group Pax under the Freedom of Information Act.

==== Cluster munitions ====
Coalition forces used 61,000 cluster munitions containing 20 million submunitions during the Gulf War, and 13,000 cluster munitions containing two million submunitions during the 2003 invasion and subsequent insurgency. Thousands of unexploded munitions from the invasion and previous wars, including cluster munitions, mines and other unexploded ordnance, still posed a threat to civilians as of 2022.

=== Military preparations ===
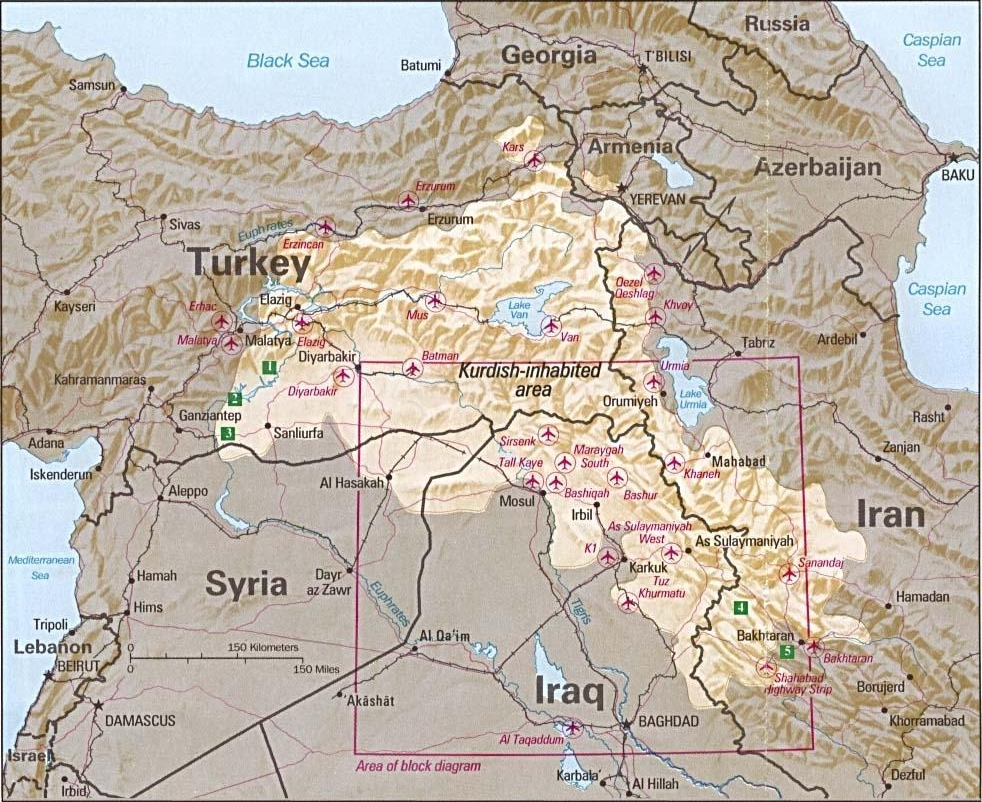
Kurdish areas in Northern Iraq

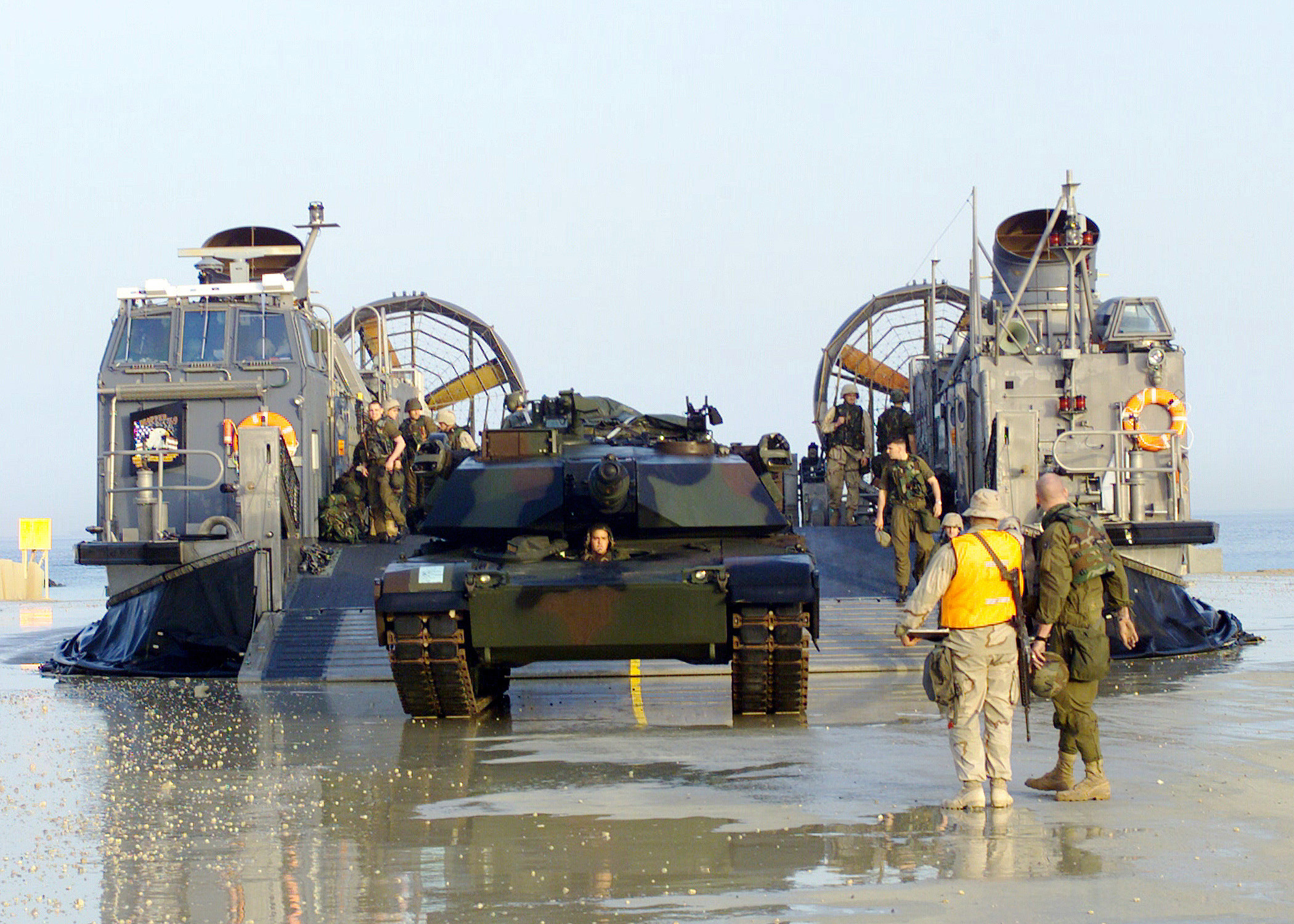
U.S. Marine M1A1 tank is off-loaded from a U.S. Navy LCAC in Kuwait in February 2003

==== Special operations forces ====
CIA Special Activities Division (SAD) and MI6 (E Squadron) paramilitary teams entered Iraq in July 2002 before the 2003 invasion. Once on the ground they prepared for the subsequent arrival of American and British military forces. SAD teams then combined with U.S. Army Special Forces to organize the Kurdish Peshmerga. This joint team combined to defeat Ansar al-Islam, an ally of Al Qaeda, in a battle in the northeast corner of Iraq. A chemical weapons facility at Sargat was also captured. Sargat was the only facility of its type discovered in the Iraq war. The U.S. side was carried out by Paramilitary Officers from SAD and the Army's 10th Special Forces Group.

SAD teams also conducted high-risk special reconnaissance missions behind Iraqi lines to identify senior leadership targets. These missions led to the initial strikes against Saddam Hussein and his key generals. Although the initial strikes against Saddam were unsuccessful in killing the dictator or his generals, they were successful in effectively ending the ability to command and control Iraqi forces. Other strikes against key generals were successful and significantly degraded the command's ability to react to and maneuver against the U.S.-led invasion force coming from the south.

SAD operations officers were also successful in convincing key Iraqi army officers to surrender their units once the fighting started or not to oppose the invasion force. NATO member Turkey refused to allow its territory to be used for the invasion. As a result, the SAD/SOG and U.S. Army Special Forces joint teams and the Kurdish Peshmerga constituted the entire northern force against government forces during the invasion. Their efforts kept the 5th Corps of the Iraqi army in place to defend against the Kurds rather than moving to contest the coalition force in the south. Four of these CIA officers were awarded the Intelligence Star for their actions.

MI6 conducted Operation Mass Appeal which was a campaign to plant stories about Iraq's WMDs in the media and boost support for the invasion. MI6 also went on to bribe many of Saddam's closest allies to turn over information and intelligence.

According to Tommy Franks, "April Fool", an American officer working undercover as a diplomat, was approached by an Iraqi intelligence agent. April Fool then sold the Iraqi false "top secret" invasion plans provided by Franks' team. This deception misled the Iraqi military into deploying major forces in northern and western Iraq in anticipation of attacks by way of Turkey or Jordan, which never took place. This greatly reduced the defensive capacity in the rest of Iraq, and facilitated the actual attacks via Kuwait and the Persian Gulf in the southeast.

==== No-fly zones ====
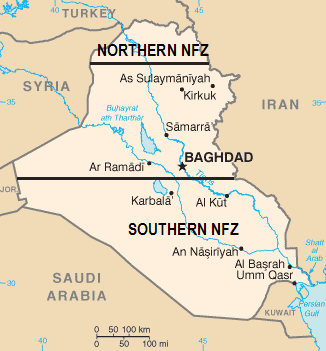

Since the Gulf War, the U.S. and UK had been attacked by Iraqi air defenses while enforcing Iraqi no-fly zones. These zones, and the attacks to enforce them, were described as illegal by the former UN Secretary-General Boutros Boutros-Ghali, and the French foreign minister Hubert Vedrine. Other countries, notably Russia and China, also condemned the zones as a violation of Iraqi sovereignty. In mid-2002, the U.S. began more carefully selecting targets in the southern part of the country to disrupt the military command structure in Iraq. A change in enforcement tactics was acknowledged at the time, but it was not made public that this was part of a plan known as Operation Southern Focus.

The amount of ordnance dropped on Iraqi positions by coalition aircraft in 2001 and 2002 was less than in 1999 and 2000 which was during the Clinton administration. However, information obtained by the UK Liberal Democrats showed that the UK dropped twice as many bombs on Iraq in the second half of 2002 as they did during the whole of 2001. The tonnage of UK bombs dropped increased from 0 in March 2002 and 0.3 in April 2002 to between 7 and 14 tons per month in May–August, reaching a pre-war peak of 54.6 tons in September – before the U.S. Congress' 11 October authorization of the invasion.

The 5 September attacks included a 100+ aircraft attack on the main air defense site in western Iraq. According to an editorial in New Statesman this was "located at the furthest extreme of the southern no-fly zone, far away from the areas that needed to be patrolled to prevent attacks on the Shias. It was destroyed not because it was a threat to the patrols, but to allow allied special forces operating from Jordan to enter Iraq undetected."

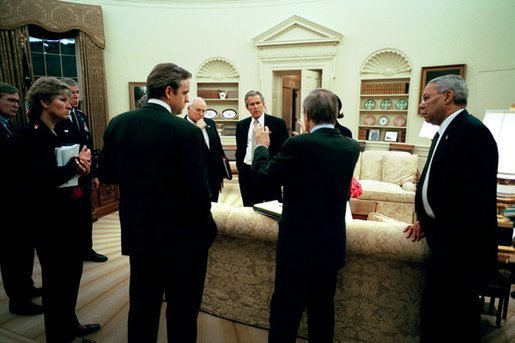
U.S. President George W. Bush meets with his top advisors on 19 March 2003 just before the invasion

Tommy Franks, who commanded the invasion, has since admitted that the bombing was designed to "degrade" Iraqi air defences in the same way as the air attacks that began the Gulf War. These "spikes of activity" were, in the words of then-British Defence Secretary, Geoff Hoon, designed to 'put pressure on the Iraqi regime' or, as The Times reported, to "provoke Saddam Hussein into giving the allies an excuse for war". In this respect, as provocations designed to start a war, leaked British Foreign Office legal advice concluded that such attacks were illegal under international law.

Another attempt at provoking the war was mentioned in a leaked memo from a meeting between Bush and Blair on 31 January 2003, in which Bush allegedly told Blair that "The U.S. was thinking of flying U2 reconnaissance aircraft with fighter cover over Iraq, painted in UN colours. If Saddam fired on them, he would be in breach." On 17 March, Bush gave Saddam 48 hours to leave the country, along with his sons Uday and Qusay, or face war.

== Invasion ==
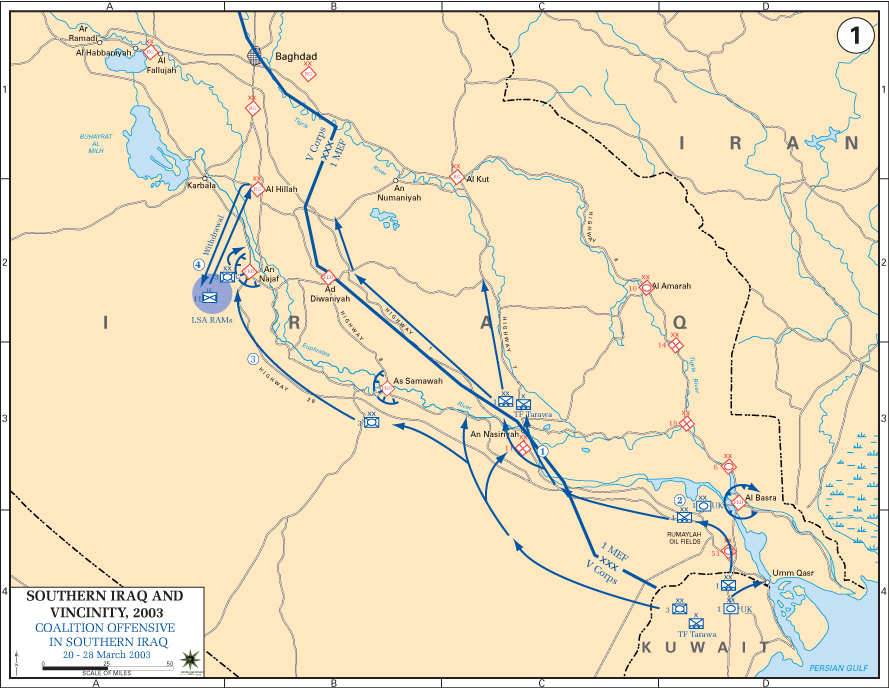
Coalition movement from 20 to 28 March 2003

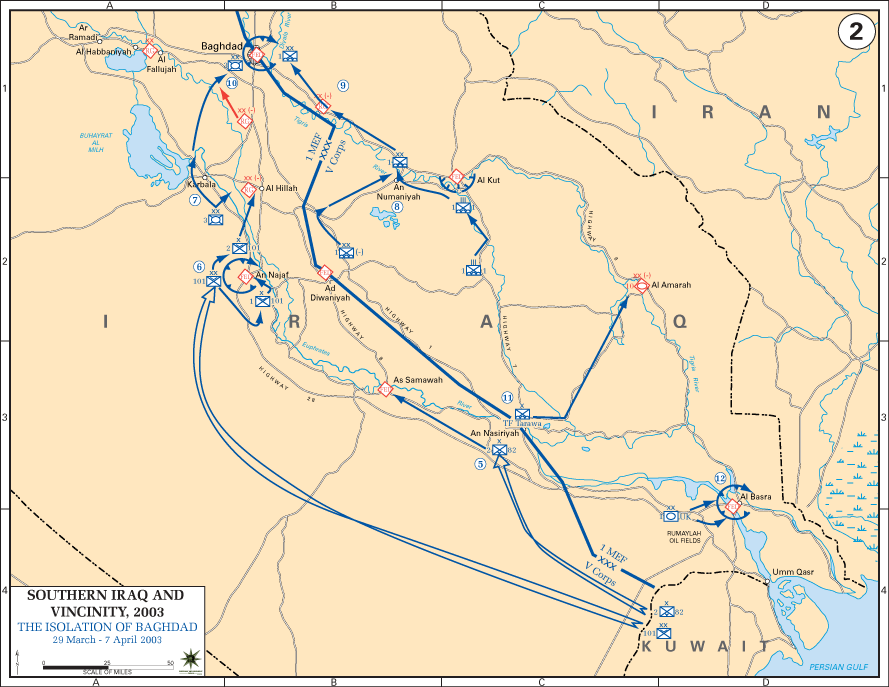
Coalition movements from 29 March to 7 April

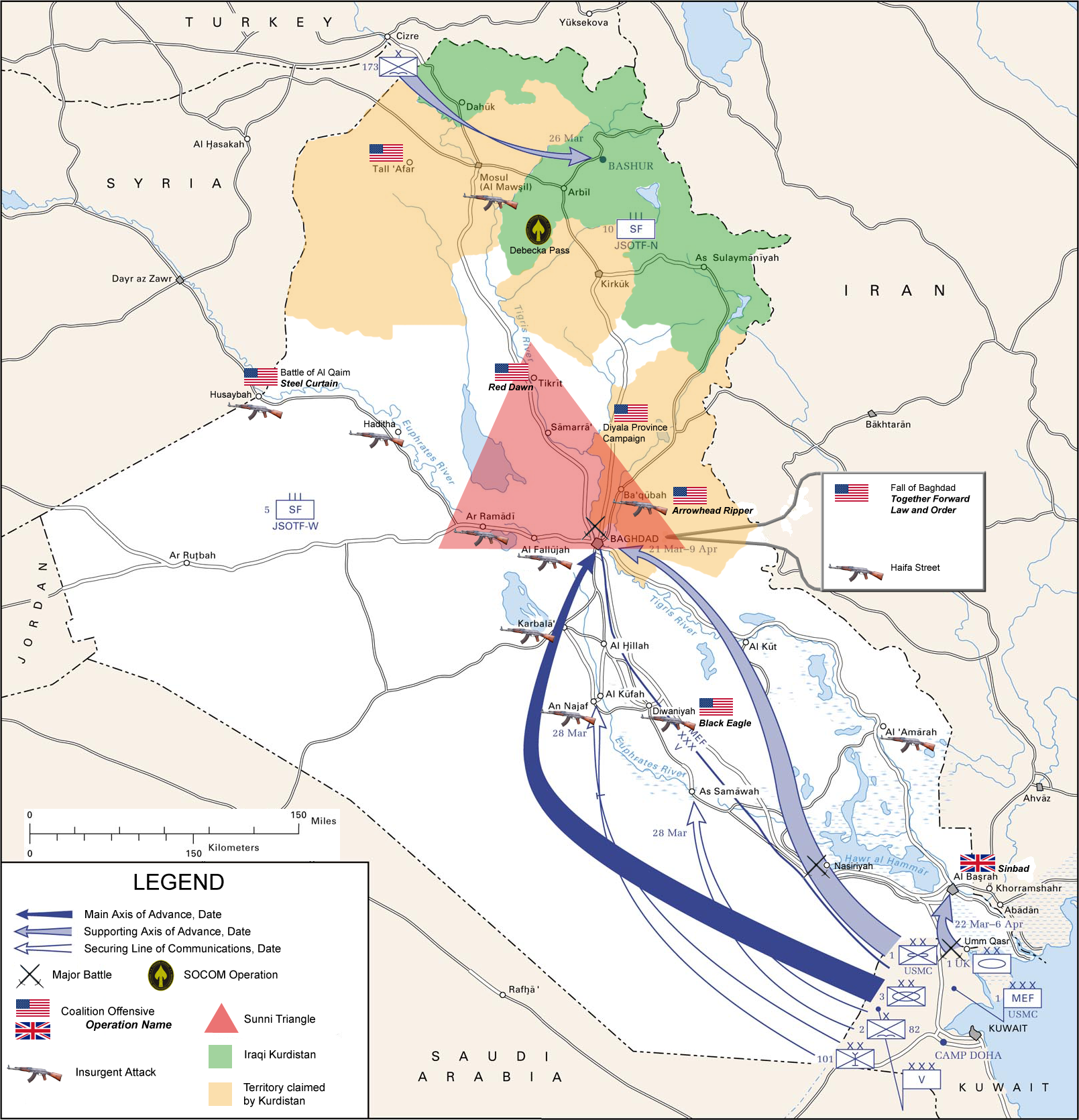
Routes and major battles fought by the coalition

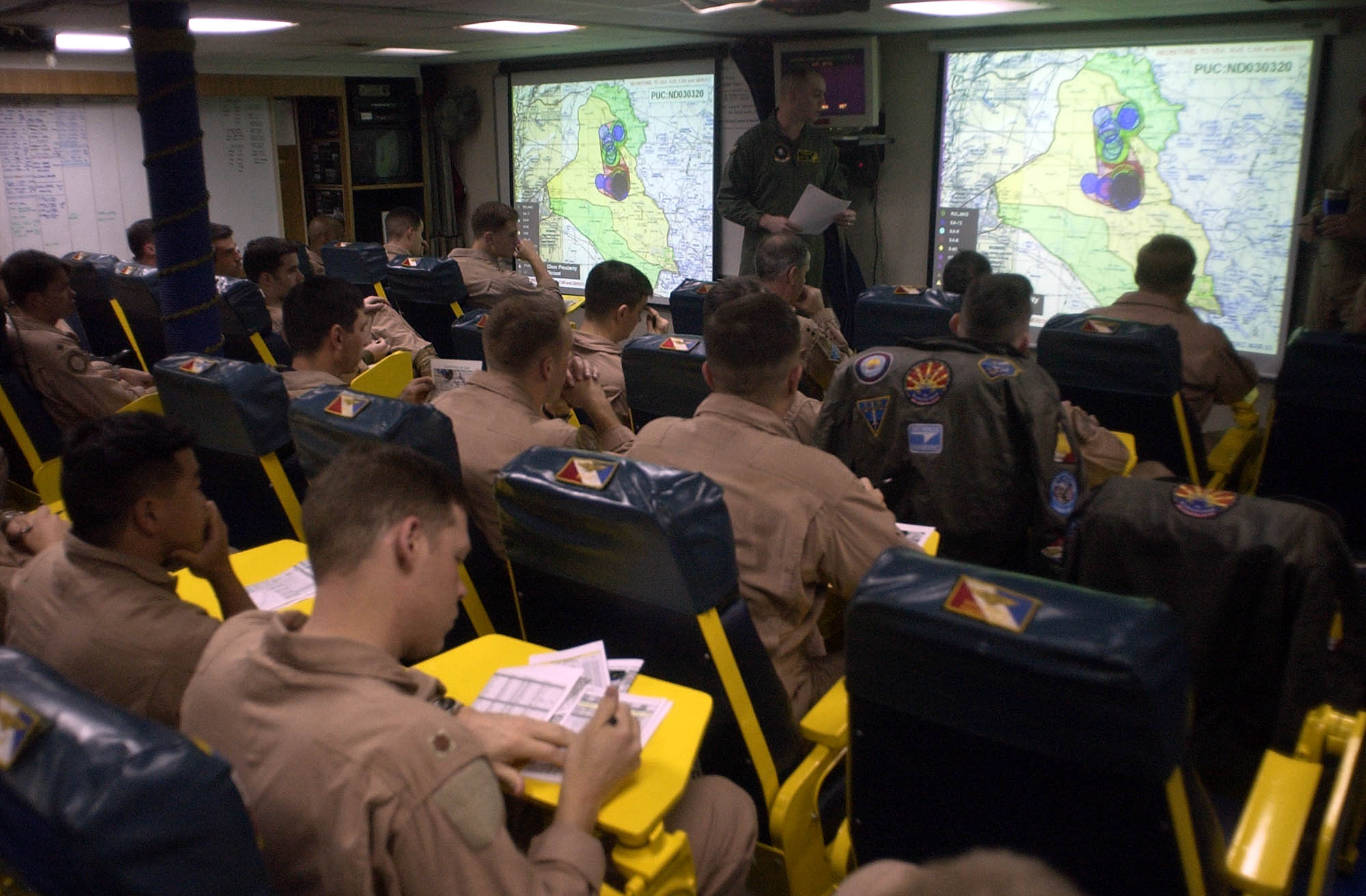
Carrier Air Wing Two (CVW-2) mission briefing aboard Constellation (CV-64), 21 March 2003.

=== Preceding special forces mission in al-Qa'im ===
On the night of 17 March 2003, the majority of B and D squadron British 22nd SAS Regiment, designated as Task Force 14, crossed the border from Jordan to conduct a ground assault on a suspected chemical munitions site at a water-treatment plant in the city of al-Qa'im. It had been reported that the site might have been a SCUD missile launch site or a depot; an SAS officer was quoted by author Mark Nicol as saying "it was a location where missiles had been fired at Israel in the past, and a site of strategic importance for WMD material." The 60 members of D squadron, along with their 'Pinkie' Desert Patrol Vehicles (the last time the vehicles were used before their retirement), were flown 120 km (75 miles) into Iraq in 6 MH-47Ds in 3 waves. Following their insertion, D squadron established a patrol laager at a remote location outside al-Qa'im and awaited the arrival of B squadron, who had driven overland from Jordan. Their approach to the plant was compromised, and a firefight developed which ended in one 'pinkie' having to be abandoned and destroyed. Repeated attempts to assault the plant were halted, leading the SAS to call in an air strike which silenced the opposition.

=== Opening salvo: the Dora Farms strike ===
In the early morning of 19 March, U.S. forces abandoned the plan for initial, non-nuclear decapitation strikes against 55 top Iraqi officials, in light of reports that Saddam was visiting Uday and Qusay at Dora Farms, in the Dora farming community in southern Baghdad. At approximately 04:42 Baghdad time, two F-117 Nighthawk stealth fighters from the 8th Expeditionary Fighter Squadron dropped four enhanced, satellite-guided 2,000-pound GBU-27 'Bunker Busters' on the compound. Complementing the aerial bombardment were nearly 40 Tomahawk cruise missiles fired from several ships, including the Ticonderoga-class cruiser USS Cowpens, credited with the first to strike, Arleigh Burke-class destroyers USS Donald Cook and USS Porter, as well as two submarines in the Red Sea and Persian Gulf.

One bomb missed the compound entirely, while the other three impacted the site on the other side of an electrified wall surrounding the main palace building, damaging it and destroying every other structure in the compound. Saddam was not present, nor were any members of the Iraqi leadership. Baghdad-area hospitals reported that the attack killed one civilian and injured fourteen others, including four men, nine women and one child. Later sources indicated that Saddam had not visited the farm since 1995, while others claimed that Saddam had been at the compound that morning, but had left before the strike, which Bush had ordered delayed until the 48-hour deadline had expired.

=== Opening attack ===
On 19 March at 21:00, the first strike of the operation was carried out by members of the 160th SOAR: a flight of MH-60L DAPs (Direct Action Penetrators) and four 'Black Swarm' flights – each consisting of a pair of AH-6M Little Birds and a FLIR equipped MH-6M to identify targets for the AH-6s (each Black swarm flight was assigned a pair of A-10As)—engaged Iraqi visual observation posts along the southern and western borders of Iraq. Within seven hours, more than 70 sites were destroyed, effectively depriving the Iraqi military of any early warning of the coming invasion. As the sites were eliminated, the first heliborne SOF teams launched from H-5 air base in Jordan, including vehicle-mounted patrols from the British and Australian components transported by the MH-47Ds of the 160th SOAR. Ground elements of Task Force Dagger, Task Force 20, Task Force 14, and Task Force 64 breached the sand berms along the Iraqi border with Jordan, Saudi Arabia, and Kuwait in the early morning hours and drove into Iraq. Unofficially, the British, Australians, and Task Force 20 had been in Iraq weeks prior.

On 20 March at approximately 02:30 UTC, at 05:34 local time, explosions were heard in Baghdad. Special operations commandos from the CIA's Special Activities Division from the Northern Iraq Liaison Element infiltrated throughout Iraq and called in the early air strikes. At 03:16 UTC, or 10:16 pm EST, Bush announced that he had ordered an attack against "selected targets of military importance" in Iraq. When this word was given, the troops on standby crossed the border into Iraq.

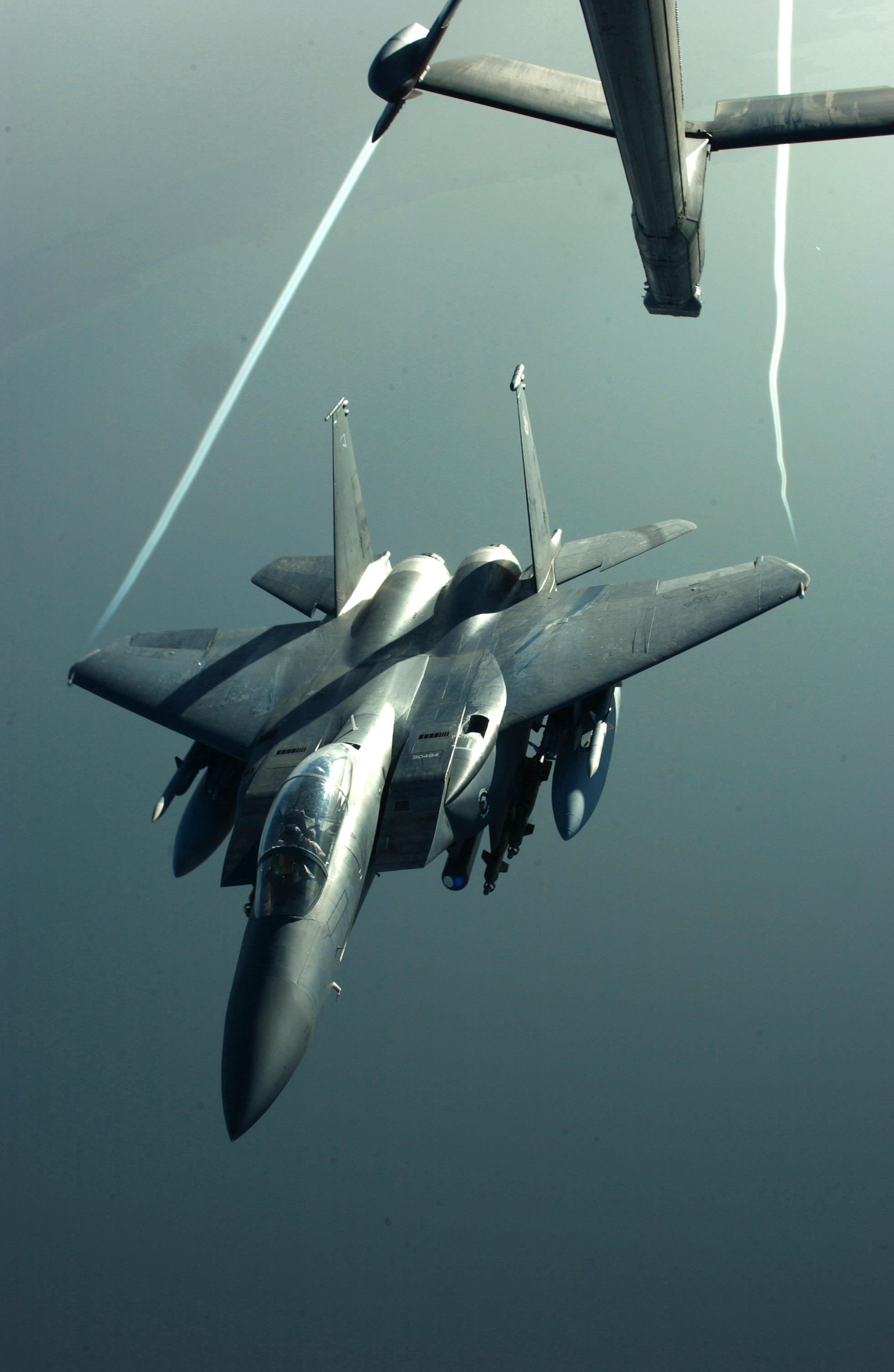
Wingtip vortices are visible trailing from an F-15E as it disengages from midair refueling with a KC-10 during Operation Iraqi Freedom

Before the invasion, many observers had expected a longer campaign of aerial bombing before any ground action, taking as examples the Gulf War or the 2001 invasion of Afghanistan. In practice, U.S. plans envisioned simultaneous air and ground assaults to incapacitate the Iraqi forces quickly which resulted in the shock and awe military campaign attempting to bypass Iraqi military units and cities in most cases. The assumption was that superior mobility and coordination of coalition forces would allow them to attack the heart of the Iraqi command structure and destroy it in a short time, and that this would minimize civilian deaths and damage to infrastructure. It was expected that the elimination of the leadership would lead to the collapse of Iraq's military and government, and that much of the population would support the invaders once the government had been weakened. Occupation of cities and attacks on peripheral military units were viewed as undesirable distractions.

Following Turkey's decision to deny any official use of its territory, the coalition was forced to modify the planned simultaneous attack from north and south. Special Operations forces from the CIA and U.S. Army managed to build and lead the Kurdish Peshmerga into an effective force and assault for the North. The primary bases for the invasion were in Kuwait and other Persian Gulf states. One result of this was that one of the divisions intended for the invasion was forced to relocate and was unable to take part in the invasion until well into the war.

The Iraqis immediately adapted to the invasion, and began using unconventional tactics. On 22 March, American troops first encountered the insurgency tactics that would later define the war. Sgt. 1st Class Anthony Broadhead, a platoon sergeant in the Crazy Horse troop of the 3rd Infantry Division's cavalry unit, was in a tank heading towards a bridge in Samawah on the invasion route. He waved at a group of Iraqis, but instead of waving back, they began attacking the American tanks with AK-47 rifles, rocket-propelled grenades, and mortars. Because these types of paramilitary forces were well-armed, but indistinguishable from civilians, they would come to pose a significant challenge for U.S. forces throughout Iraq War.

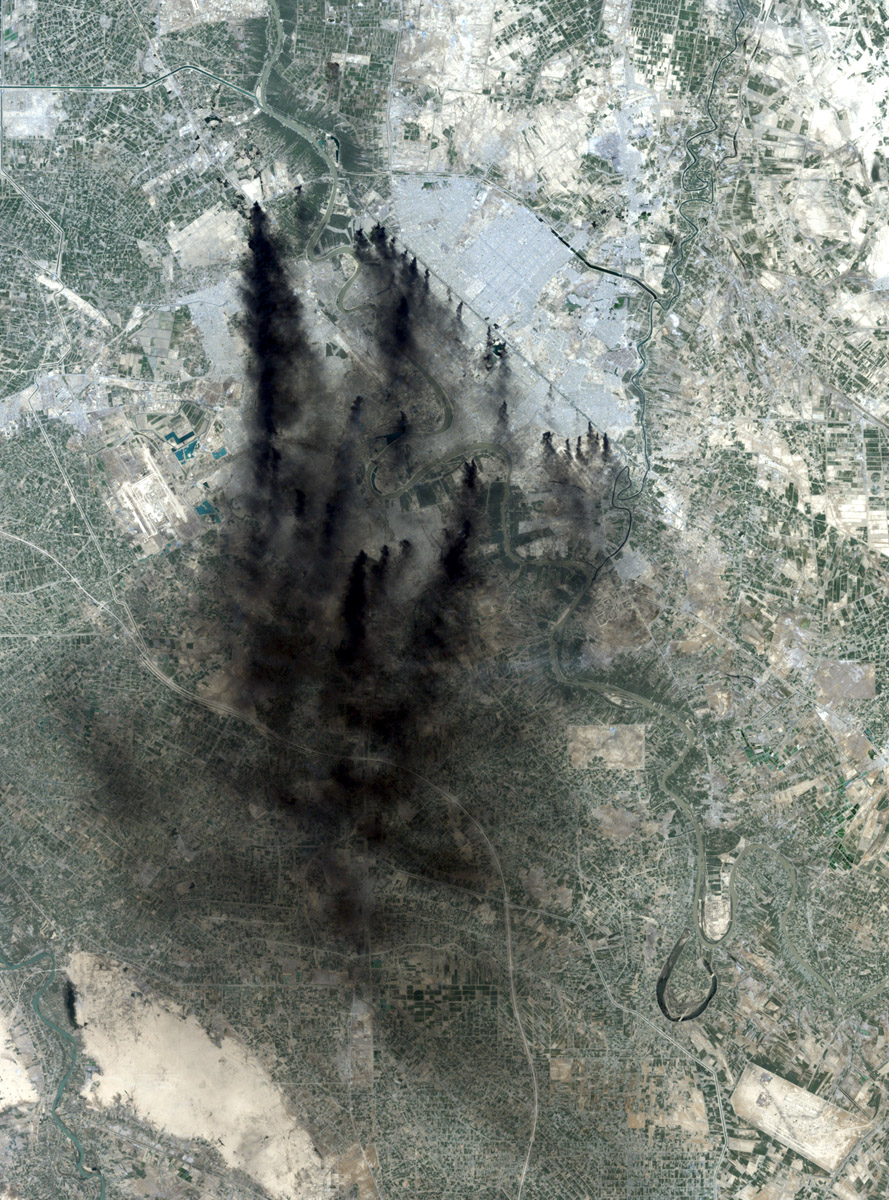
NASA Landsat 7 image of Baghdad, 2 April 2003. The dark streaks are smoke from oil well fires set in an attempt to hinder attacking air forces

The invasion itself was swift, leading to the collapse of the Iraqi government and the military of Iraq in about three weeks. The oil infrastructure of Iraq was rapidly seized and secured with limited damage in that time. Securing the oil infrastructure was considered of great importance. Before the invasion, Iraqi forces had mined some 400 oil wells around Basra and the Al-Faw peninsula with explosives. Coalition troops launched an air and amphibious assault on the Al-Faw peninsula during the closing hours of 19 March to secure the oil fields there; the amphibious assault was supported by warships of the Royal Navy, Polish Navy, and Royal Australian Navy.

In the meantime, British Royal Air Force (RAF) Tornados from 9 and 617 Squadrons attacked the radar defence systems protecting Baghdad, but lost a Tornado on 22 March along with the pilot and navigator (Flight Lieutenant Kevin Main and Flight Lieutenant Dave Williams), shot down by an American Patriot missile as they returned to their air base in Kuwait. On 1 April, an F-14 from USS Kitty Hawk crashed in southern Iraq reportedly due to engine failure, and a S-3B Viking plunged off the deck of the USS Constellation after a malfunction and an AV-8B Harrier jump jet went into the Gulf while it was trying to land on the USS Nassau.

The British 3 Commando Brigade, with the U.S. Navy's Special Boat Team 22, Task Unit Two, as well as the U.S. Marine Corps' 15th Marine Expeditionary Unit and the Polish Special Forces unit GROM attached, attacked the port of Umm Qasr. There they met with heavy resistance by Iraqi troops. A total of 14 coalition troops and 30–40 Iraqi troops were killed, and 450 Iraqis taken prisoner. The British Army's 16 Air Assault Brigade alongside elements of the RAF Regiment also secured the oil fields in southern Iraq in places like Rumaila while the Polish commandos captured offshore oil platforms near the port, preventing their destruction. Despite the rapid advance of the invasion forces, some 44 oil wells were destroyed and set ablaze by Iraqi explosives or by incidental fire. However, the wells were quickly capped and the fires put out, preventing the ecological damage and loss of oil production capacity that had occurred at the end of the Gulf War.

In keeping with the rapid advance plan, the U.S. 3rd Infantry Division moved westward and then northward through the western desert toward Baghdad, while the 1st Marine Expeditionary Force moved along Highway 1 through the center of the country, and 1 (UK) Armoured Division moved northward through the eastern marshland.

During the first week of the war, Iraqi forces fired a Scud missile at the American Battlefield Update Assessment center in Camp Doha, Kuwait. The missile was intercepted and shot down by a Patriot missile seconds before hitting the complex. Subsequently, two A-10 Warthogs attacked the missile launcher.

==== Battle of Nasiriyah ====
Initially, the U.S.' 1st Marine Division fought through the Rumaila oil fields, and moved north to Nasiriyah—a moderate-sized, Shi'ite-dominated city with important strategic significance as a major road junction and its proximity to nearby Tallil Airfield. It was also situated near a number of strategically important bridges over the Euphrates River. The city was defended by a mix of regular Iraqi army units, Ba'ath loyalists, and Fedayeen from both Iraq and abroad. The U.S. Army 3rd Infantry Division defeated Iraqi forces entrenched in and around the airfield and bypassed the city to the west.

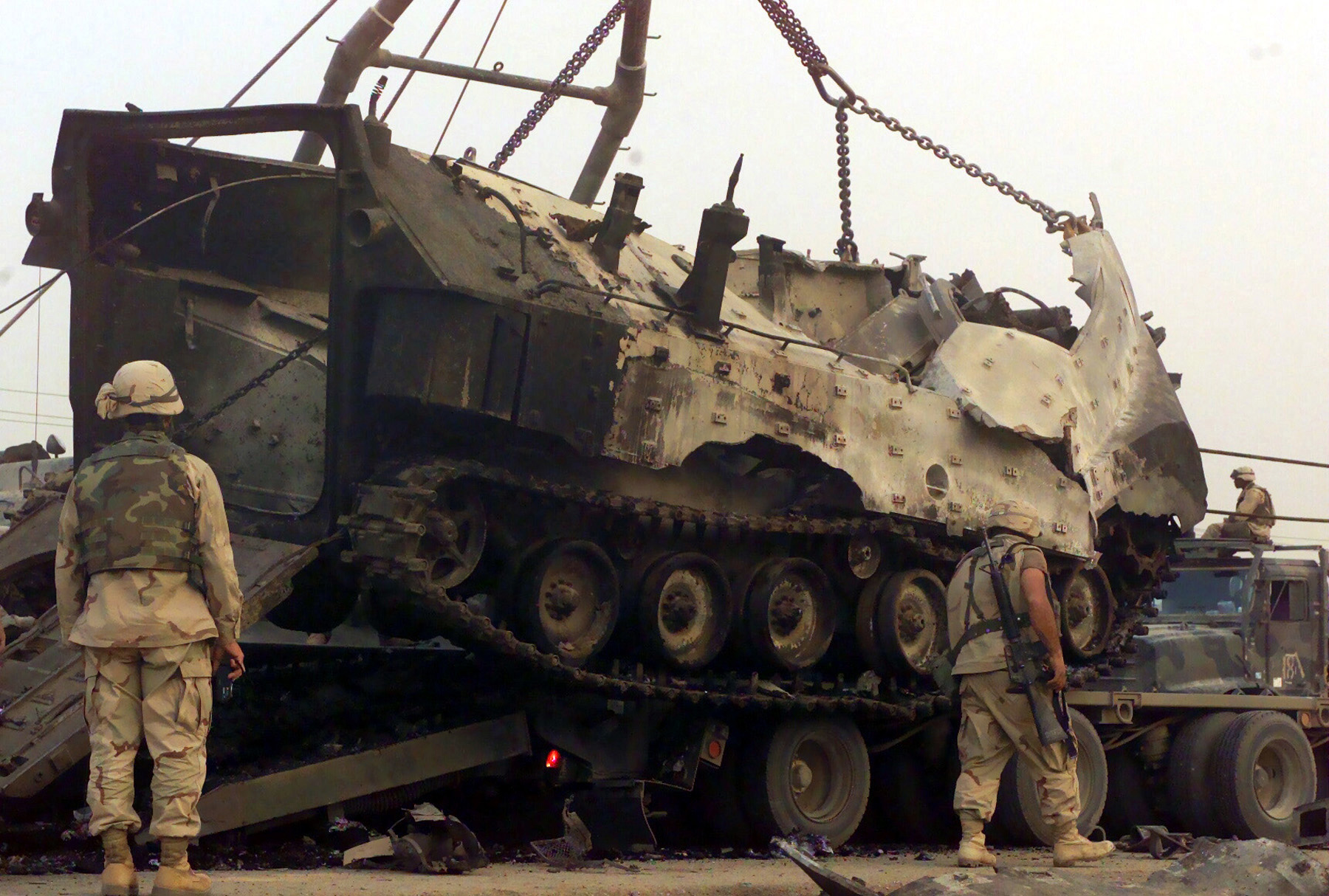
A U.S. amphibious fighting vehicle destroyed near Nasiriyah

On 23 March, a convoy from the 3rd Infantry Division, including the female American soldiers Jessica Lynch, Shoshana Johnson, and Lori Piestewa, was ambushed after taking a wrong turn into the city. Eleven U.S. soldiers were killed, and seven, including Lynch and Johnson, were captured. Piestewa died of wounds shortly after capture, while the remaining five prisoners of war were later rescued. Piestewa, who was from Tuba City, Arizona, and an enrolled member of the Hopi Tribe, was believed to have been the first Native American woman killed in combat in a foreign war. On the same day, U.S. Marines from the 2nd Marine Division entered Nasiriyah in force, facing heavy resistance as they moved to secure two major bridges in the city. Several marines were killed during a firefight with Fedayeen in the urban fighting. At the Saddam Canal, another 18 marines were killed in heavy fighting with Iraqi soldiers. An Air Force A-10 was involved in a case of friendly fire that resulted in the death of six Marines when it accidentally attacked an American amphibious vehicle. Two other vehicles were destroyed when a barrage of RPG and small arms fire killed most of the Marines inside. A Marine from Marine Air Control Group 28 was killed by enemy fire, and two Marine engineers drowned in the Saddam Canal. The bridges were secured and the Second Marine division set up a perimeter around the city.

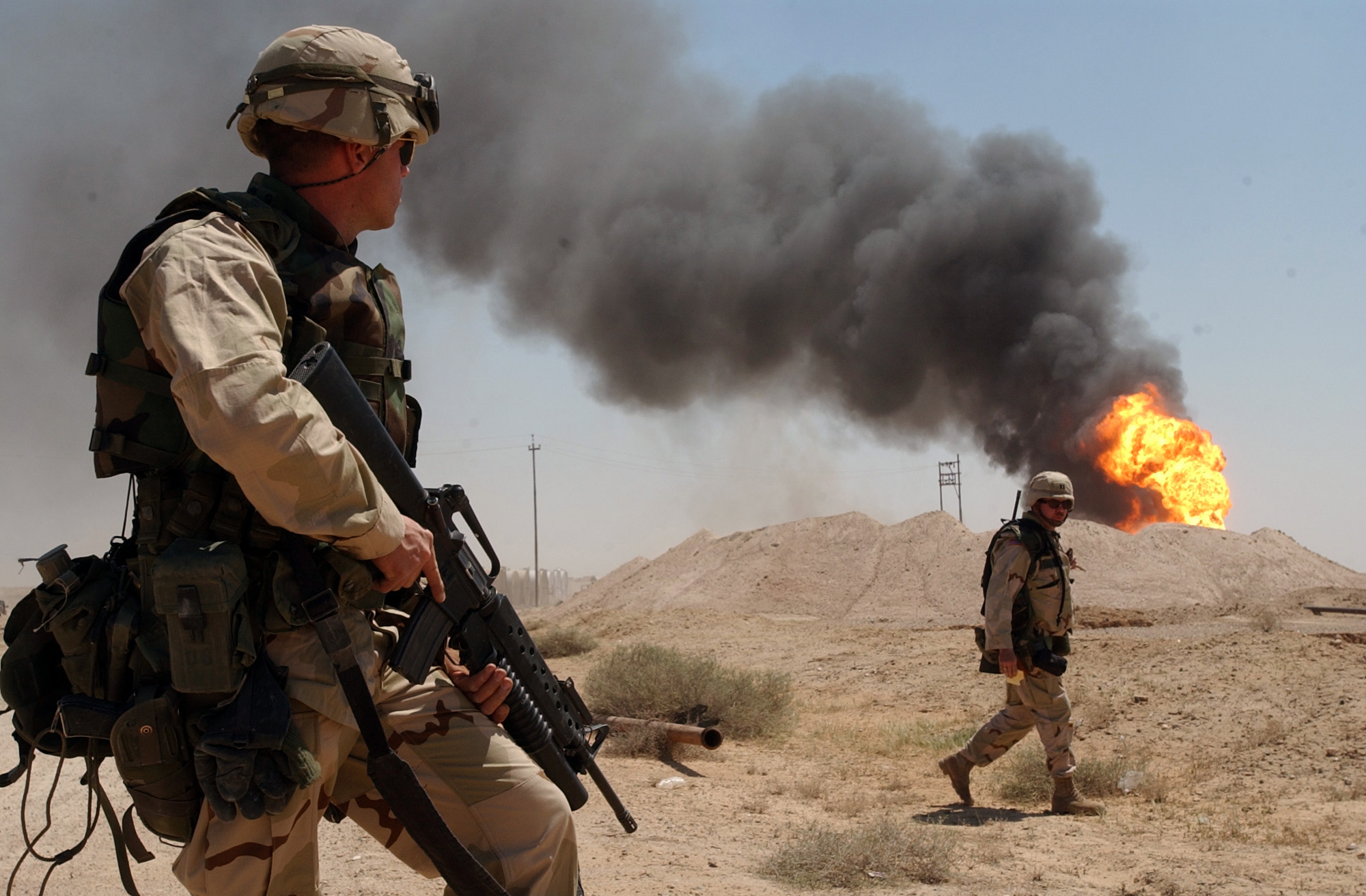
A U.S. soldier stands guard duty near a burning oil well in the Rumaila oil field, 2 April 2003

On the evening of 24 March, the 2nd Light Armored Reconnaissance Battalion, which was attached to Regimental Combat Team One (RCT-1), pushed through Nasiriyah and established a perimeter 15 km (9.3 miles) north of the city. Iraqi reinforcements from Kut launched several counterattacks. The Marines managed to repel them using indirect fire and close air support. The last Iraqi attack was beaten off at dawn. The battalion estimated that 200–300 Iraqi soldiers were killed, without a single U.S. casualty. Nasiriyah was declared secure, but attacks by Iraqi Fedayeen continued. These attacks were uncoordinated, and resulted in firefights that killed many Fedayeen. Because of Nasiriyah's strategic position as a road junction, significant gridlock occurred as U.S. forces moving north converged on the city's surrounding highways.

With the Nasiriyah and Tallil Airfields secured, coalition forces gained an important logistical center in southern Iraq and established FOB/EAF Jalibah, some 10 miles (16 km) outside Nasiriyah. Additional troops and supplies were soon brought through this forward operating base. The 101st Airborne Division continued its attack north in support of the 3rd Infantry Division.

By 28 March, a severe sandstorm slowed the coalition advance as the 3rd Infantry Division halted its northward drive halfway between Najaf and Karbala. Air operations by helicopters, poised to bring reinforcements from the 101st Airborne, were blocked for three days. There was particularly heavy fighting in and around the bridge near the town of Kufl.

==== Battle of Najaf ====
Destroyed Iraqi T-72 tank on Highway 9 outside Najaf

Another fierce battle was at Najaf, where U.S. airborne and armored units with British air support fought an intense battle with Iraqi Regulars, Republican Guard units, and paramilitary forces. It started with U.S. AH-64 Apache helicopter gunships setting out on a mission to attack Republican Guard armored units; while flying low the Apaches came under heavy anti-aircraft, small arms, and RPG fire which heavily damaged many helicopters and shot one down, frustrating the attack. They attacked again successfully on 26 March, this time after a pre-mission artillery barrage and with support from F/A-18 Hornet jets, with no gunships lost.

The 1st Brigade Combat Team's air defense battery supported by a COLT (combat observation lasing team) and the Brigade Recon Troop moved in to secure the bridge at Al Kifl late on 24 March. When the ADA company was unable to secure the western bank of the bridge the commander called for reinforcements. Col. Grimsley order LTC Marcone Task Force 3-69 Armor to send a quick reaction force to support the ADA company. LTC Marcone sent B 3-7 Infantry to clear and secure the bridge. Bravo Company was made up of two infantry platoons with M2A2 Bradley Fighting Vehicles and one platoon of M1A2 Abrams tanks. Bravo 3-7 Infantry secured the bridge and fought for 36 hours through a sandstorm. During that time, the soldiers fought against Iraqi Military and Fedayeen forces. After 36 hours, B co 3-7 Infantry was relieved on 26 March.

The 101st Airborne Division on 29 March, supported by a battalion from the 1st Armored Division, attacked Iraqi forces in the southern part of the city, near the Imam Ali Mosque and captured Najaf's airfield. Four Americans were killed by a suicide bomber. On 31 March, the 101st made a reconnaissance-in-force into Najaf. On 1 April, elements of the 70th Armored Regiment launched a "Thunder Run", an armored thrust through Najaf's city center, and, with air support, defeated the Iraqi forces after several days of heavy fighting. The city was secured by 4 April.

==== Battle of Basra ====
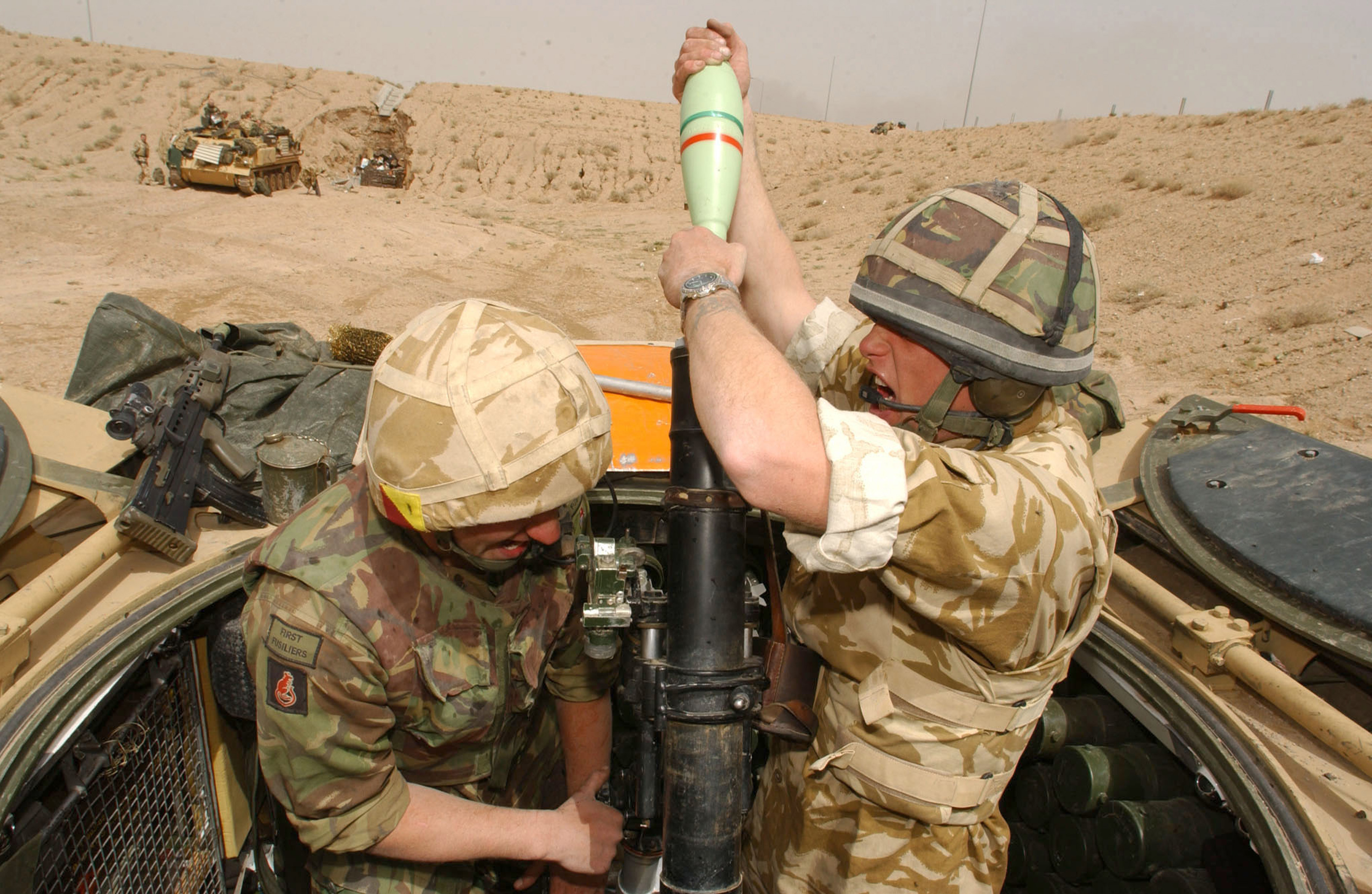
British soldiers engage Iraqi Army positions with their 81mm Mortars south of Basra, 26 March 2003.

The Iraqi port city of Umm Qasr was the first British obstacle. A joint Polish-British-American force ran into unexpectedly stiff resistance, and it took several days to clear the Iraqi forces out. Farther north, the British 7 Armoured Brigade, fought their way into Iraq's second-largest city, Basra, on 6 April, coming under constant attack by regulars and Fedayeen, while 3rd Battalion, The Parachute Regiment cleared the 'old quarter' of the city that was inaccessible to vehicles. Entering Basra was achieved after two weeks of fierce fighting, including a tank battle when the Royal Scots Dragoon Guards destroyed 14 Iraqi tanks on 27 March. A few members of D Squadron, British SAS, were deployed to southern Iraq to support the coalition advance on Basra. The team conducted forward route reconnaissance and infiltrated the city and brought in strikes on the Ba'athist loyalist leadership.

Elements of 1 (UK) Armoured Division began to advance north towards U.S. positions around Al Amarah on 9 April. Pre-existing electrical and water shortages continued throughout the conflict and looting began as Iraqi forces collapsed. While coalition forces began working with local Iraqi Police to enforce order, a joint team composed of Royal Engineers and the Royal Logistic Corps of the British Army rapidly set up and repaired dockyard facilities to allow humanitarian aid to begin to arrive from ships arriving in the port city of Umm Qasr.

After a rapid initial advance, the first major pause occurred near Karbala. There, U.S. Army elements met resistance from Iraqi troops defending cities and key bridges along the Euphrates River. These forces threatened to interdict supply routes as American forces moved north. Eventually, troops from the 101st Airborne Division of the U.S. Army secured the cities of Najaf and Karbala to prevent any Iraqi counterattacks on the 3rd Infantry Division's lines of communication as the division pressed its advance toward Baghdad.

Eleven British soldiers were killed, while 395–515 Iraqi soldiers, irregulars, and Fedayeen were killed.

The efforts of the British Army facilitated the re-establishment of the rail lines from the port to Baghdad.

=== Battle of Karbala ===
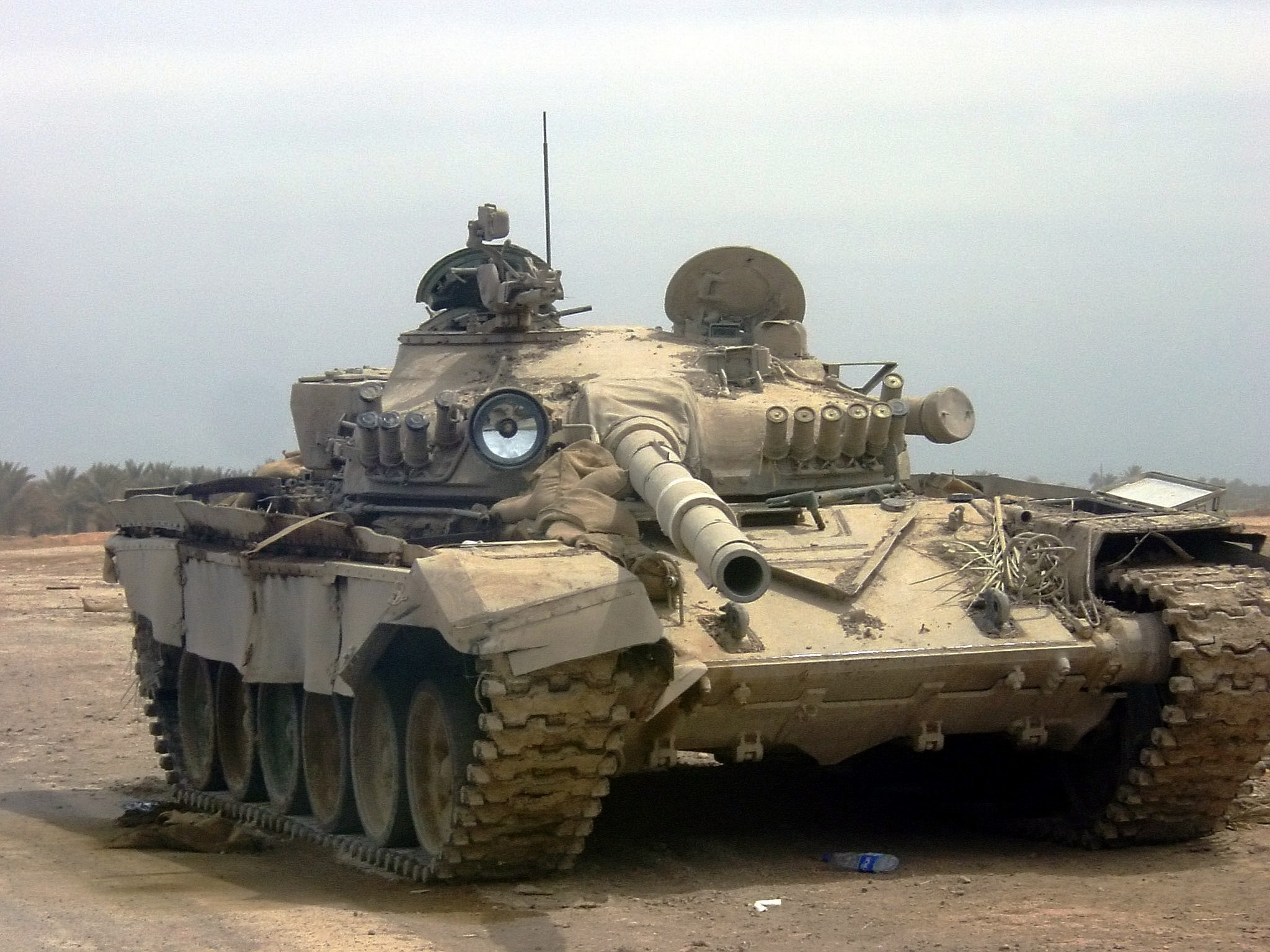
A Lion of Babylon tank abandoned after facing the final U.S. push into Baghdad

The Karbala Gap was a 20–25-mile wide strip of land with the Euphrates River to the east and Lake Razazah to the west. This strip of land was recognized by Iraqi commanders as a key approach to Baghdad, and was defended by some of the best units of the Iraqi Republican Guard. The Iraqi high command had originally positioned two Republican Guard divisions blocking the Karbala Gap. Here these forces suffered heavy coalition air attacks. However, the coalition had since the beginning of March been conducting a strategic deception operation to convince the Iraqis that the U.S. 4th Infantry Division would be mounting a major assault into northern Iraq from Turkey.

=== Special operations ===
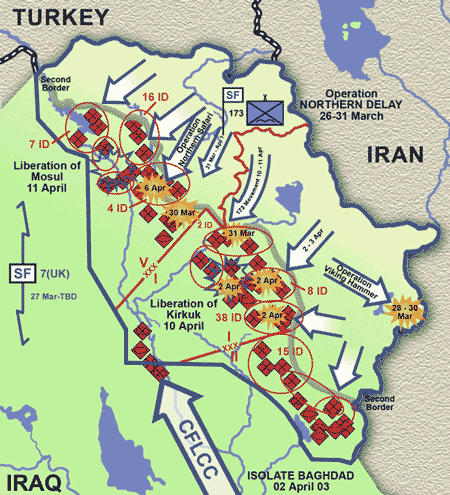
The northern front during March and April 2003

==== Initial infiltration ====
B Squadron, Delta Force (known as "Wolverines"), accompanied by several Air Force Special Tactics teams, a Delta intelligence and Target Acquisition, several military working dog teams and two Iraqi-American interpreters, was the first American SOF unit to enter western Iraq, crossing the border from Arar, Saudi Arabia in 15 customized Pinzgauer 6x6 Special Operations Vehicles and several armed Toyota Hilux pick up trucks. As part of Task Force 20, their formal role was to conduct selected high-priority site exploitation on suspected chemical weapon facilities before heading for the Haditha Dam complex. Along the way, Delta supported the seizure of H-3 Air Base and also conducted numerous deception operations to confuse the Iraqis as to the disposition of coalition forces in the west. From the south, a week before the invasion began, two members of Special Boat Team 22's Delta Detachment and the Commanding Officer of the 539th Assault Squadron Royal Marine Commandos, were infiltrated into southern Iraq by Kuwait intelligence operatives to gather critical intelligence for the upcoming assault on the port of Um Qasr.

==== Operation Row and Falconer ====
On 18 March 2003, B and D Squadrons of the British 22nd SAS Regiment had now infiltrated Iraq in full strength (D Squadron by air and B Squadron by ground) along with 1 Squadron Australian SASR and headed for H-2 and H-3 Air Base. They set up observation posts and called in airstrikes that defeated the Iraqi defenders. The combined British and Australian Squadrons took H-2 virtually unopposed. H-3 was secured on 25 March with the assistance of members of Delta Force and by Green Beret ODAs from Bravo company, 1st Battalion 5th SFG; a company of Rangers and Royal Marines from 45 Commando flew from Jordan to the bases and the base was handed over to them. The SAS teams moved to the next objective – the intersection of the two main highways linking Baghdad with Syria and Jordan, where both squadrons were involved in conducting interdictions of fleeing Iraqi leadership targets heading for Syria.

Previously, 16 (Air) Troop of D squadron conducted mounted reconnaissance of an Iraqi army facility near the Syrian border, followed by a harassing attack on the site, two other troops had conducted mobile ambushes on Iraqi units in the area, although they themselves were being hunted by a large Fedayeen Saddam unit mounted in technicals.

In northern Iraq in early March, a small reconnaissance team from M Squadron of the British Special Boat Service mounted on Honda ATVs inserted into Iraq from Jordan. Its first mission was to conduct reconnaissance of an Iraqi air base at al-Sahara. The team was compromised by an anti-special forces Fedayeen unit and barely escaped thanks to a U.S. F-15E that flew air cover for the team and an RAF Chinook that extracted the team from out under the Fedayeen's "noses". A second larger SBS operation was launched by M Squadron in full strength in a mix of land rovers and ATVs into northern Iraq from H-2 air base, the objective was to locate, make contact and take the surrender of the Iraqi 5th Army Corps somewhere past Tikrit and to survey and mark viable temporary landing zones for follow-on forces. However the Squadron was compromised by a goat herder; the SBS drove for several days while unknown to them anti-special forces Fedayeen units followed them. At an overnight position near Mosul, the Fedayeen ambushed the Squadron with DShK heavy machine guns and RPGs, the SBS returned fire and began taking fire from a T-72, the Squadron scattered and escaped the well-constructed trap. A number of Land Rovers became bogged down in a nearby wadi, so they mined the vehicles and abandoned them – though several did not detonate and were captured and exhibited on Iraqi television. The SBS was now in three distinct groups: one with several operational Land Rovers was being pursued by the Iraqi hunter force, a second mainly equipped with ATVs was hunkered down and trying to arrange extraction, the third with just 2 operators on an ATV raced for the Syrian border. The first group tried to call in coalition strike aircraft but the aircraft could not identify friendly forces because the SBS were not equipped with infra-red strobes – although their vehicles did have Blue Force Tracker units, they eventually made it to an emergency rendezvous point and were extracted by an RAF Chinook. The second group was also extracted by an RAF Chinook and the third group made it to Syria and was held there until their release was negotiated, there were no SBS casualties.

==== Operation Viking Hammer ====
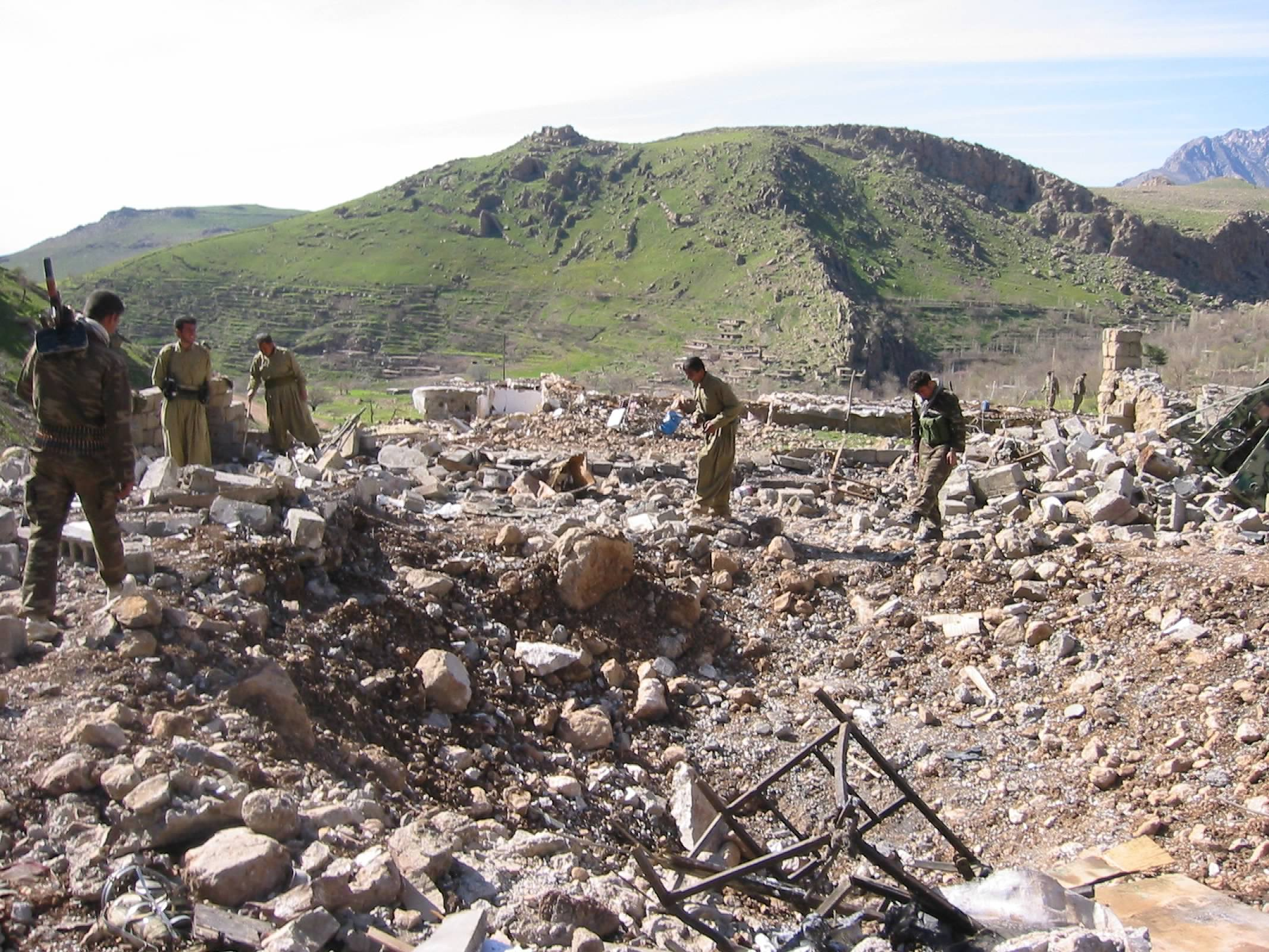
Aftermath of Battle

In the early hours of 21 March 2003, as part of Operation Viking Hammer, 64 Tomahawk cruise missiles struck the Ansar al-Islam camp and the surrounding sites, the terrorist group – numbering around 700 – had inhabited a valley near Halabja Iraqi Kurdistan, along with a small Kurdish splinter faction; they had prepared a number of defensive positions including anti-aircraft machine guns and maintained a facility, that American intelligence suspected, at which chemical and biological agents may have been developed and stored for future terrorist attacks. Viking Hammer was set to begin on 21 March, however, the ground component of the operation was set back several days owing to the issues around infiltrating most of the 3rd Battalion 10th SFG into Iraq. The Islamic Group of Kurdistan surrendered after having suffered 100 men killed in the 21 March strikes.

On 28 March, the ground element of Operation Viking Hammer was finally launched with a six-pronged advance, each prong was composed of several ODAs from 3rd Battalion, 10th SFG and upwards of 1,000 Kurdish Peshmerga fighters. The main advance set off towards Sargat – the location of the suspected chemical and biological weapons site; the force was soon pinned down by DShK heavy machine-gun fire from the surrounding hills. A pair of U.S. Navy F/A-18s responded to an urgent CAS request from the force and dropped two 500lb JDAMs on the Ansar al-Islam machine gun nests and strafed the positions with 20 mm cannon before departing due to being low on fuel. The advance began again only to be halted once more by fire from prepared DShK and PKM machine gun nests, Green Berets from ODA 081 deployed a Mk 19 grenade launcher from the back of a Toyota Tacoma and suppressed the gun positions allowing the Peshmerga to assault and wipe out the terrorists. After capturing the town of Gulp, the force continued onto the village of Sargat; the village was heavily defended by fortified fighting positions mounting DShKs and mortars along with several BM-21 Grad. Unable to call in airstrikes due to the close proximity of the Peshmerga, a Green Beret sergeant used a dismounted M2 HMG to suppress the entrenched terrorists, his actions allowed the Peshmerga to bring forward their own 82 mm Mortars and Grads which forced the Ansar al-Islam fighters to retreat. Task Force Viking advanced to secure the Daramar Gorge – which was surrounded by caves in the rock walls – the Peshmerga were again engaged by small arms fire and RPGs which it and the ODAs returned fire with heavy weapons, however, it became obvious that they could not advance any further without air support. To dislodge the terrorists, the Combat Controllers attached to the ODAs vectored in U.S. Navy F/A-18s which dropped six 500 lb JDAMs that shut down any further resistance. During the night, four AC-130 gunships maintained the pressure on the retreating Ansar al-Islam terrorists as they pulled back toward the Iranian border; the next day, Task Force Viking seized the high ground and pushed down through the valley – surrounding and killing small pockets of remnants from Ansar al-Islam. With their objectives completed, the 3rd Battalion and their Peshmerga returned to the green line to assist the push on Kirkuk and Mosul. A specialist SSE team was brought in to document the find at Sargat, the team recovered traces of several chemicals including Ricin along with stocks of NBC protective suits, atropine injectors and Arabic manuals on chemical weapons and IED construction. Estimates of Ansar al-Islam dead number over 300, many of them foreign fighters, while only 22 Peshmerga fighters were killed.

==== Special operations in northern Iraq ====
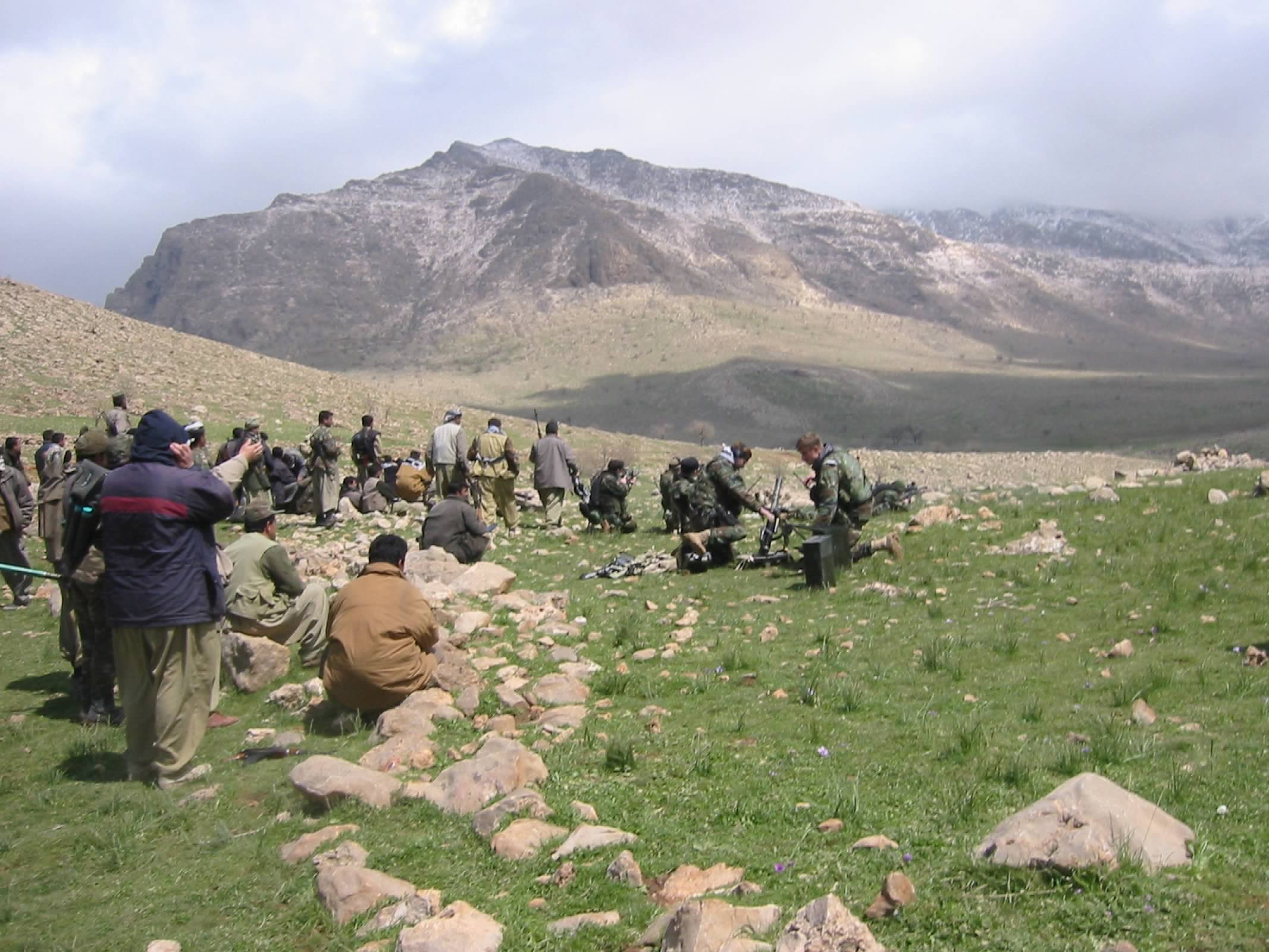
Peshmerga, U.S. Special Operations

In the north, the 10th Special Forces Group (10th SFG) and CIA paramilitary officers from their Special Activities Division had the mission of aiding the Patriotic Union of Kurdistan and the Kurdistan Democratic Party, de facto rulers of Iraqi Kurdistan, and employing them against the 13 Iraqi divisions located near Kirkuk and Mosul. Turkey had officially prohibited any coalition troops from using their bases or airspace, so lead elements of the 10th SFG had to make a detour infiltration; their flight was supposed to take four hours but instead took ten. On 22 March, the majority of 2nd and 3rd Battalions 10th SFG, from Task Force Viking flew from their forward staging area in Constanta, Romania to a location near Irbil aboard six MC-130H Combat Talons. Several were engaged by Iraqi air defences on the flight into northern Iraq (one was sufficiently damaged enough that it was forced to make an emergency landing at Incirlik Air Base). The initial lift had deployed 19 Green Beret ODAs and four ODBs into northern Iraq. Hours after the first of such flights, Turkey did allow the use of its air space and the rest of the 10th SFG infiltrated in. The preliminary mission was to destroy the base of the Kurdish terrorist group Ansar al-Islam, believed to be linked to al-Qaeda. Concurrent and follow-on missions involved attacking and fixing Iraqi forces in the north, thus preventing their deployment to the southern front and the main effort of the invasion. Eventually Task Force Viking would number 51 ODAs and ODBs alongside some 60,000 Kurdish Peshmerga militia of the Patriotic Union of Kurdistan (PUK).

On 26 March, the 173rd Airborne Brigade augmented the invasion's northern front by parachuting into northern Iraq onto Bashur Airfield, controlled at the time by elements of 10th SFG and Kurdish peshmerga. The fall of Kirkuk on 10 April to the 10th SFG, CIA Paramilitary Teams and Kurdish peshmerga precipitated the 173rd's planned assault, preventing the unit's involvement in combat against Iraqi forces during the invasion.

Following the Battle of Haditha Dam, Delta Force handed the dam over to the Rangers and headed north to conduct ambushes along the highway above Tikrit, tying up Iraqi forces in the region and attempting to capture fleeing high-value targets trying to escape to Syria.

On 2 April 2003, Delta was engaged by half a dozen armed technicals from the same anti-special forces Fedayeen that had previously fought the SBS. Two Delta operators were wounded (one serious); the squadron requested an urgent aeromedical evacuation and immediate close-air support as a company of truck-borne Iraqi reinforcements arrived. Two MH-60K Blackhawks carrying a para jumper medical team and two MH-60L DAPs of the 160th SOAR responded and engaged the Iraqis, which allowed the Delta operators to move their casualties to an emergency HLZ and they were medevaced to H-1 escorted by a pair of A-10As, however Master Sergeant George Fernandez died. The DAPs stayed on station and continued to engage the Iraqis, destroying a truck carrying a mortar and several infantry squads, while Delta snipers killed Iraqi infantryman firing on the DAPs, another pair of A-10As arrived and dropped airburst 500 lb bombs within 20m of Delta positions and killed a large number of Iraqi infantry gathering in a wadi. The DAPs spotted several Iraqi units and engaged them until they were dangerously low on fuel.

Task Force Viking launched an operation to seize the town of Ain Sifni. The town was strategically important because it straddles the main highway into Mosul. Once the town fell, it would be clear for the coalition to advance on Mosul. ODAs from the 3rd and 10th SFG called in airstrikes on the Iraqi garrisons in and around the town, causing many of the Iraqi conscripts to flee. By 5 April 2003, there appeared to be only two Iraqi platoons left in the town. On 6 April, ODAs 051, 055, and 056 assaulted the town – ODAs 055 and 056 provided fire support along with Peshmerga heavy weapons teams, while ODA 51 made the actual assault on the town. As ODA 51 cautiously advanced on the village, it came under intense fire – the two platoons of Iraqis turned out to be closer to battalion strength and equipped with heavy weapons like 82 mm mortars, anti-aircraft guns, and an artillery piece. After four hours of F/A-18 airstrikes and constant heavy weapons fire from ODA 055 and 056, the assault force entered Ain Sifni; soon afterward, Iraqi infantry counterattacked, supported by several mortars, attempting to retake the town, but it was beaten back by ODA 51 and the Kurds.

On 6 April, ODA 391 and ODA 392 from the 3rd SFG and ODA 044 from 10th SFG with about 150 Kurdish fighters were the main force involved in the Battle of Debecka Pass.

On 9 April, nine ODAs from FOB 103 encircled Kirkuk after fierce fighting to capture the ridges overlooking the approaches to the city. The earlier capture of the nearby city of Tuz had largely broken the will of the Iraqi Army and only the Fedayeen remained in Kirkuk. The first ODA units entered the city the next day; a week later the 173rd Airborne took over responsibility for the city. After some minor skirmishes the Fedayeen fled. Staging out of MSS Grizzly, Delta mounted operations to interdict Ba'ath Party HVTs on Highway 1 (Highway 2 and 4 in western Iraq had been secured by British SAS and Australian SAS teams), on 9 April, the combined team seized an airfield near Tikrit.

The successful occupation of Kirkuk came after approximately two weeks of fighting that included the Battle of the Green Line (the unofficial border of the Kurdish autonomous zone) and the subsequent Battle of Kani Domlan Ridge (the ridgeline running northwest to southeast of Kirkuk), the latter fought exclusively by 3rd Battalion, 10th SFG and Kurdish peshmerga against the Iraqi 1st Corps. The 173rd Brigade would eventually take responsibility for Kirkuk days later, becoming involved in the counterinsurgency fight and remain there until redeploying a year later.

On 11 April, an advanced element from FOB 102, numbering no more than thirty Green Berets, advanced into Mosul. The advance had followed several days of heavy airstrikes on three Iraqi divisions defending Mosul. On 13 April, 3rd Battalion 3rd SFG and a battalion from the 10th Mountain Division were ordered to Mosul to relieve the 10th SFG and their Peshmerga allies. Further reinforcing operations in northern Iraq, the 26th Marine Expeditionary Unit (Special Operations Capable), serving as Landing Force Sixth Fleet, deployed in April to Erbil and subsequently Mosul via Marine KC-130 flights. The 26 MEU (SOC) maintained security of the Mosul airfield and surrounding area until relief by the 101st Airborne Division.

==== Special operations in southern Iraq ====
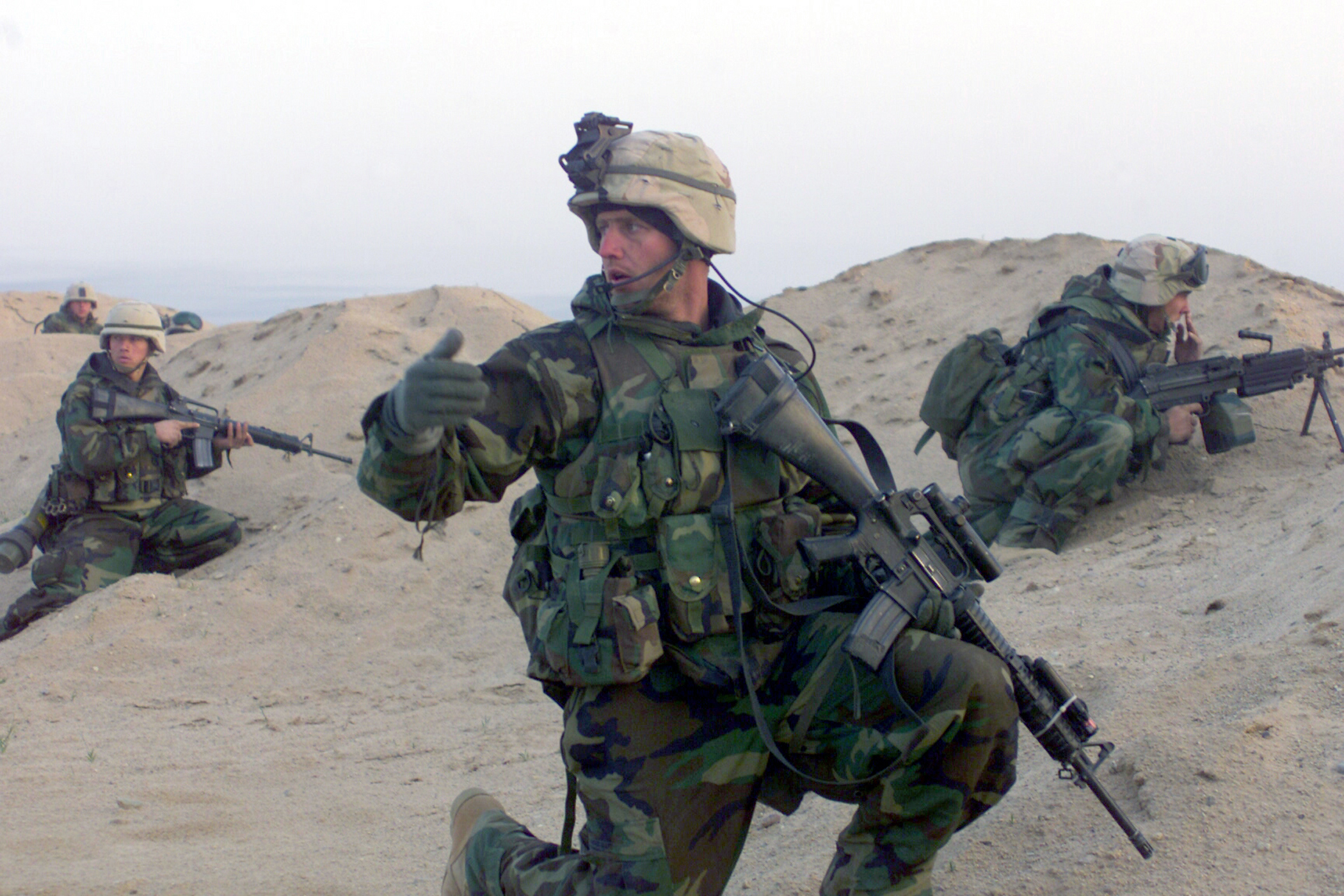
A squad leader with the 15th Marine Expeditionary Unit (Special Operations Capable) (15th MEU (SOC))

On 21 March, ODA 554 of Bravo Company, 2nd Battalion 5th SFG crossed the border with the U.S. Marines to support the seizure of the Rumaylah oil fields which was later secured by UK forces; half the team later drove to the outskirts of Basra and successfully picked up four Iraqi oil industry technicians who had been recruited by the CIA to assist in safeguarding the oil fields from destruction. They later rejoined the other half of the team and fought roving bands of Fedayeen. The ODAs next mission was to work with a CIA-recruited Sheikh and assist British forces in identifying targets around Basra. The ODA soon established an informant network, they eventually assisted the British in rounding up some 170 Fedayeen in the city; they were eventually replaced by members of G Squadron 22nd SAS Regiment.

==== Battle of Haditha Dam ====
The Battle of Haditha Dam occurred on 24 March 2003, Rangers from 3rd Battalion, 75th Ranger Regiment, conducted a combat parachute drop onto H-1 Air Base, securing the site as a staging area for operations in the west. Delta Force recce operators drove through Iraqi lines around the Haditha Dam on customised ATVs, marking targets for coalition airstrikes resulting in the eventual destruction of a large number of Iraqi armoured vehicles and anti aircraft systems. Delta's reconnaissance of the dam indicated that a larger force would be needed to seize it, so a request was made and approved for a second Delta squadron from Fort Bragg to be dispatched with a further Ranger battalion, along with M1A1 Abrams tanks from C Company, 2nd Battalion 70th Armor. C-17 flew the company from Tallil to H-1 and then to MSS (Mission Support Site) Grizzly – a desert strip established by Delta Force located between Haditha and Tikrit; C Squadron, Delta Force was flown directly to MSS Grizzly.

On 1 April, C squadron, Delta Force and 3/75th Ranger Regiment conducted a night-time ground assault in their Pinzgauers and GMVs against the Haditha Dam complex. Three platoons of Rangers seized the dams' administrative buildings with little initial opposition, while a pair of AH-6M Six Guns orbited overhead. After daybreak, a Ranger sniper shot and killed 3 Iraqis carrying RPGs on the western side of the dam and Rangers on the eastern side engaged a truck carrying infantry, which led to an hour-long contract. South of the dam, another Ranger platoon was securing the dam's power station and electricity transformer against sabotage, another platoon was occupied establishing blocking positions on the main road into the dam complex. The blocking positions came under the sporadic mortar fire, resulting in the AH-6Ms flying multiple gun runs to silence the mortar positions, another mortar team, firing from a small island was engaged and silenced by a Ranger Javelin team. For five days, Iraqi forces continued to harass the Rangers at the dam, principally with episodic artillery and mortar fire along with several infantry counterattacks against the blocking positions; the HIMARS rocket system saw its first combat deployment at the dam – firing counter-battery missions, 3 Rangers were killed on 3 April by a VBIED at the blocking positions, the car was driven by a pregnant Iraqi woman acting distressed and asking for water. Rangers captured an Iraqi forward observer dressed as a civilian after sinking his kayak with .50cal fire, the observer had maps of the Rangers positions.

==== Objective Beaver ====
Intelligence indicated that chemical and biological weapons stocks may have been located at a complex known as al Qadisiyah Research Centre along the shore of the al Qadisiyah reservoir among government and residential buildings, on the evening of 26 March, a DEVGRU assault element supported by B Company, 2nd Battalion, 75th Ranger Regiment assaulted the complex (codenamed Objective Beaver). While the first of four MH-60Ks inserted the Rangers into their blocking positions, it was engaged by small arms fire from a nearby building, an AH-6M spotted the muzzle flashes and fired a 2.75-inch rocket into the location silencing the small arms fire, the second MH-60K was also struck by small arms fire but its door gunner suppressed it. A-10As engaged nearby electricity transformers successfully blacking out the area, but it resulted in a series of explosions and a resulting fire at the stations that dramatically lit the sky – pinpointing the orbiting helicopters for enemy gunmen. Small arms fire increased as the final two MH-60Ks inserted their blocking teams, one Ranger was wounded, the two pairs of AH-6Ms and MH-60L DAPs supporting the mission continued to suppress targets as the four MH-47Es carrying the DEVGRU main assault force inserted under heavy enemy small arms fire while DEVGRU sniper teams aboard a pair of MH-6Ms engaged numerous gunmen and vehicles, one Nightstalker crew was wounded as the MH-47Es lifted off. The SEALs conducted a hasty SSE while the Ranger blocking positions received and returned fire, the AH-6Ms and the aerial snipers continued to engage enemy gunmen while the DAPs pushed further out to ensure no reinforcements approached – engaging and destroying numerous Fedayeen armed technicals. The SSE took longer than expected owing to the size and maze-like structure of the building, the mission completed after 45 minutes, later tests of the material recovered by DEVGRU showed no evidence of chemical or biological weapons at the Objective Beaver.

==== Operations in western Iraq ====
Bravo and Charlie companies of 1st Battalion 5th SFG crossed the Kuwait border at H-Hour with ODA 531 using breaching demolition charges to clear a path through the sand berms. Charlie company's seven ODAs in 35 vehicles took the southeastern operation box of the western desert heading towards the towns of Nukyab, Habbariya and Mudyasis, ODA's 534 and 532 split off to head for the area surrounding Nukyab searching for mobile Scud-B TEL launch sites. ODA 532 also inserted a mobile weather station that provided planners with vital real time weather updates of the battle space. Bravo company set out for the central town of Ar Rutba and H-3 Air Base with six ODAs and a support ODB (Operational Detachment Bravo). ODAs 523 and 524 searched a suspected Scud-B storage facility while ODAs 521 and 525 were tasked with clearing several abandoned airfields, with no sign of Scud launchers, ODA 525 deployed a Special Reconnaissance team to conduct pattern of life surveillance on the town of Ar Rutba. A two-man team called in a pair of nearby F-16C Fighting Falcons to destroy an Iraqi Army radio direction-finding facility they had identified. A second reconnaissance team from ODA 525 deployed to cover the two highways leading to Ar Rutbah, however as the team was compromised by roving Bedouins who informed the Iraqi Army garrison at Ar Rutbah of the teams presence and location, armed Iraqi technicals crewed by the Fedayeen drove out to search for them, so the Green Berets mounted their GMVs, left their hide and found a position to ambush the Fedayeen, under the weight of fire the Fedayeen retreated. ODA 525 attempted to link up with the two-man reconnaissance team and extract it to safety but large numbers of Iraqi vehicles began driving out of the town to them, the ODAs called in immediate air support. While waiting, the reconnaissance team and Target Acquisition Marines fired on the Fedayeen leaders with their suppressed MK12 sniper rifle and contacted ODA 521 (who were clearing suspects east of the town) and they reinforced ODA 525. Within minutes, F-16Cs arrived and engaged the Fedayeen vehicles, another Fedayeen convoy attempted to outflank ODA 525 but ran into the guns of ODA 524, after 4 hours of constant and punishing airstrikes on the encircling Fedayeen, eight GMVs of ODA 521 and 525 managed to extract the exposed reconnaissance team under the cover of a B-1B strategic bomber, the vehicles withdrew to ODB 520s staging area south of Ar Rutbah. Over 100 Fedayeen fighters were killed and four armed technicals were destroyed. To the west ODA 523 reinforced ODA 524, but ran into a pair of armed technicals on the highway, both were destroyed by the GMVs, the Green Berets ceased fire when a civilian station wagon full of Iraqi children drove into the middle of the firefight. ODA 522 also identified two Fedayeen armed technicals proceeding down the highway toward ODA 523, they set an ambush for them, destroying the vehicles and killing 15 Fedayeen.

The strategic intent of the US Army Special Forces ODAs had been to shut down the main supply routes and deny access around Ar Rutbah and the strategically important H-3 air base, which was defended by a battalion of Iraqi troops and significant numbers of mobile and static anti aircraft guns. On 24 March, the surrounding ODAs supported by Task Force 7 (British Special Air Service) and Task Force 64 (Australian Special Air Service Regiment) called in constant 24 hours of precision airstrikes on H-3 using SOFLAM target designators, the aerial bombardment forced the Iraqi military vehicles to leave the base and headed towards Baghdad. ODA 521 over watching the highway they were travelling on ambushed the convoy destroying a truck mounted ZU-23, the convoy was thrown into disarray, a sandstorm prevented the ODA calling in airstrikes and the convoy scattered into the desert. Bravo company 5th SFG and the coalition SOF secured the airfield, finding a Roland surface-to-air missile system, around 80 assorted anti aircraft cannon guns including ZSU-23-4 Shilka, SA-7 grail handheld SAMs and an enormous amount of ammunition. H-3 was established as an Advanced Operating Base for Bravo company, with supplies delivered by C-130s and MH-47Es; ODA 581 vehicle checkpoint managed to capture the Iraqi general in command of H-3 as he was trying to escape in civilian attire, he was secured and flown by an unmarked CIA SAD Air Branch Little Bird on 28 March for further interrogation. Additionally, ODA 523 discovered what may have been chemical weapons samples in a laboratory on the grounds of H-3.

Bravo company turned its attention to Ar Rutbah, signals intercepts by SOT-A (Support Operations Team – Alpha) and an informer network among the Bedouins as well as inhabitants of the town indicated that around 800 Fedayeen remained in the town; Fedayeen patrols from the town were engaged by surrounding Green Berets and captured. ODAs guided precision airstrikes on Fedayeen anti aircraft guns on the outskirts of the town and on top of the airstrikes, they also struck large groups of Fedayeen militia with Javelin missiles. On 9 April, nine ODAs secured the main roads into the town and commenced a day of near continuous final airstrikes from fix-wing aircraft and Apache helicopters. Civilians from the town approached the Green Berets asking them to stop the bombing, the Green Berets struck a deal with the civilians and they entered the town the next day. A B-52 and 2 F-16Cs flew show of force flights over the town as the Green Berets entered, the Fedayeen blended in with the population. Within days, the Green Berets helped the town to elect a mayor and set up markets, get sixty percent of the electricity grid working and repair water supplies. ODA 521 and 525 continued to operate in the region, stopping several trucks carrying foreign fighters, they disarmed them, took their details and warned them not to come back before sending them to Syria; in late May, the teams were replaced by the 3rd Armoured Cavalry Regiment.

==== Other special operations ====
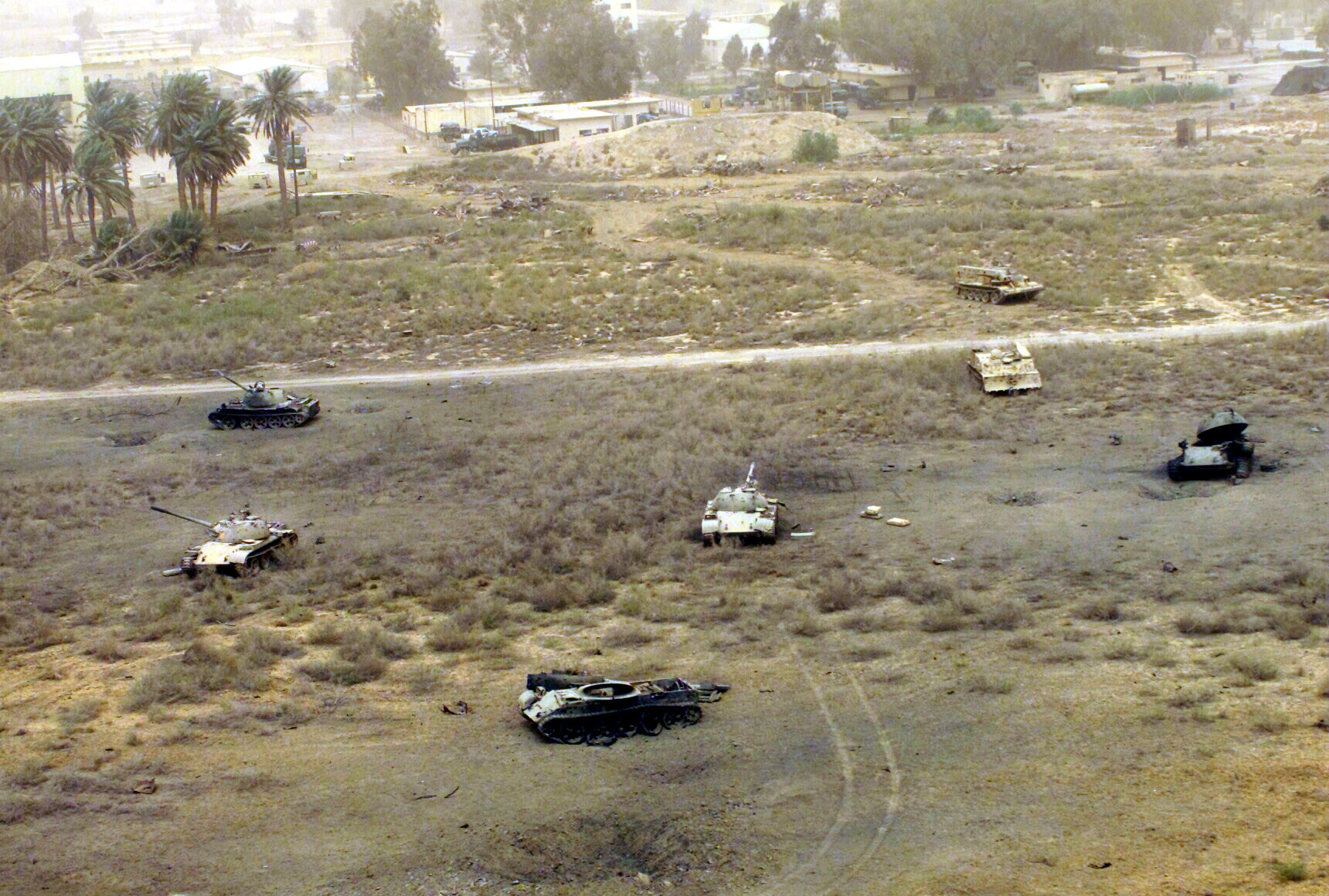
The destroyed remains of Iraqi tanks and other armored vehicles litter an Iraqi military complex west of Diwaniyah

The 2nd Battalion of the U.S. 5th Special Forces Group, U.S. Army Special Forces (Green Berets) conducted reconnaissance in the cities of Basra, Karbala and various other locations.

After Sargat was taken, Bravo Company, 3rd Battalion, 10th SFG and CIA paramilitary officers along with their Kurdish allies pushed south towards Tikrit and the surrounding towns of Northern Iraq. Previously, during the Battle of the Green Line, Bravo Company, 3/10 with their Kurdish allies pushed back, destroyed, or routed the 13th Iraqi Infantry Division. The same company took Tikrit. Iraq was the largest deployment of the U.S. Special Forces since Vietnam.

ODA 563 worked in support of the US Marines around Al Diwaniyah with local Sheikhs and their militias supported by AV-8Bs and F/A-18s; managing to capture the city of Qwam al Hamza. The following day ODA 563, their local Sheikh and his militia and a small Force Recon team captured the bridge leading to Diwaniyah and the militia attacked Iraqi positions over the bridge, forcing the Iraqi army and Fedayeen to flee toward Baghdad while being harassed by Marine Corps aircraft.

==== Jessica Lynch rescue ====
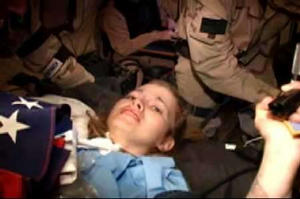
A combat camera video shows the 1 April 2003 footage of PFC Jessica Lynch on a stretcher during her rescue from Iraq.

Private first class Jessica Lynch of the 507th Maintenance Company was seriously injured and captured after her convoy was ambushed by Iraqi forces during the Battle of Nasiriyah. Initial intelligence that led to her rescue was provided by an informant who approached ODA 553 when it was working in Nasiriyah, the intelligence was passed on and Task Force 20 planned a rescue mission. Launching from the recently captured airfield at Tallil, the rescue force consisted of 290 Rangers from 1st and 2nd battalion, 75th Ranger Regiment, around 60 SEALs from DEVGRU along with Pararescue Jumpers and Combat Controllers from the 24th Special Tactics Squadron conventional Marines from Task Force Tarawa then currently fighting through the city and aviators from the Army, Marines and Air Force. The plan called for Task Force Tarawa to conduct a deception mission by seizing the bridges across the Euphrates to draw attention away from the hospital Lynch was held at, an airstrike by U.S. Marine AV-8 Harriers would be conducted against one of the bridges to confuse the opposition further and U.S. Marine AH-1W Cobras were tasked to fly over the area to conceal the sound of incoming SOF helicopters. Air cover was provided by an AC-130 Spectre and a Marine EA-6B Prowler to jam any enemy SAM systems that might be present. With the deception mission underway, the SEAL and select Ranger elements would be inserted by MH-60K Blackhawks and four MH-6 Little Birds, supported by four AH-6 attack helicopters and two MH-60L DAPs, the other Rangers would be flown in by Marine CH-46s and CH-53 transport helicopters to establish a cordon around the hospital grounds. The main assault force of SEALs would arrive by a ground convoy of AGMS Pandur forearmed vehicles and GMV trucks while the hostage rescue element landed directly on the objective in MH-6 Little Birds.

At 0100 on 1 April 2003, TF Tarawa commenced their deception mission, CIA elements cut the city's power as the helicopters approached their objective, the AH-6s led the way, behind them the MH-6s dropped off Task Force 20 sniper teams at strategic locations around and on the hospital. The DAPs and the AH-6s covered the MH-60Ks as they dropped off assault teams on the hospital roof and another by the front door, the ground assault convoy arrived and the assaulters raced inside and onto the second floor where Lynch was located. 13 minutes later, a MH-60K touched down near the hospital entrance with a team of PJs and SOAR medics on board and transported Lynch to Tallil where it rendezvoused with a standby medical flight and then onto Kuwait, and finally the U.S. The hospital was devoid of any Fedayeen, although evidence suggested they were using it as a base; the Ranger blocking teams experienced some sporadic direct fire, the SEALs and the Rangers eventually recovered the remains of eight members of Lynch's unit that had been killed or died of their wounds. Task Force 20 carried out one of the first successful U.S. prisoner of war rescue missions since World War II.

=== Fall of Baghdad (April 2003) ===
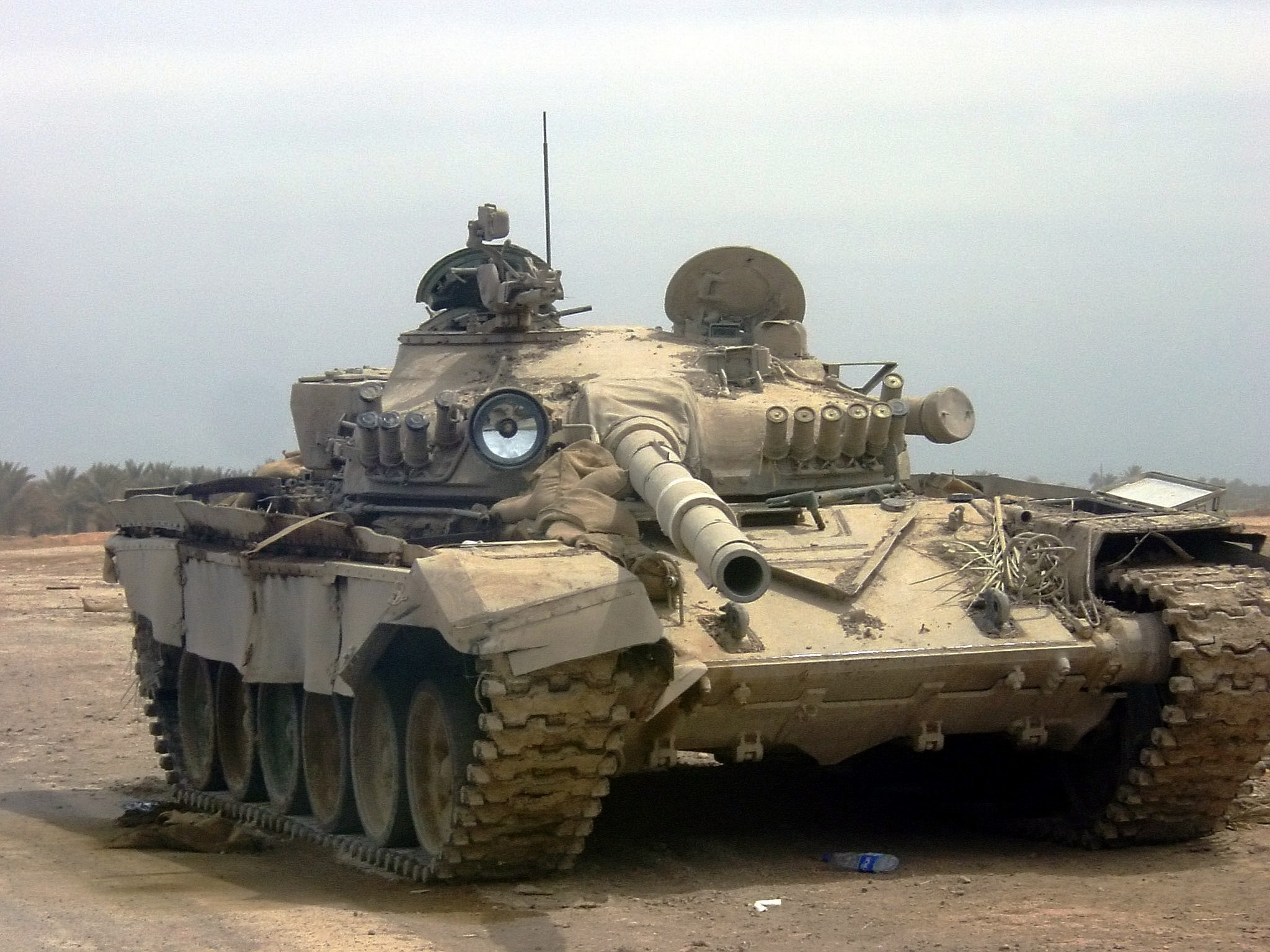
A T72 Asad Babil abandoned after facing the final U.S. thrust into Baghdad

Three weeks into the invasion, the Army's 3rd Infantry Division, with the 1st Marine Division also present, moved into Baghdad. Units of the Iraqi Special Republican Guard led the defence of the city. The rest of the defenders were a mixture of Republican Guard units, regular army units, Fedayeen Saddam, and non-Iraqi Arab volunteers. Initial plans were for coalition units to surround the city and gradually move in, forcing Iraqi armor and ground units to cluster into a central pocket in the city, and then attack with air and artillery forces.

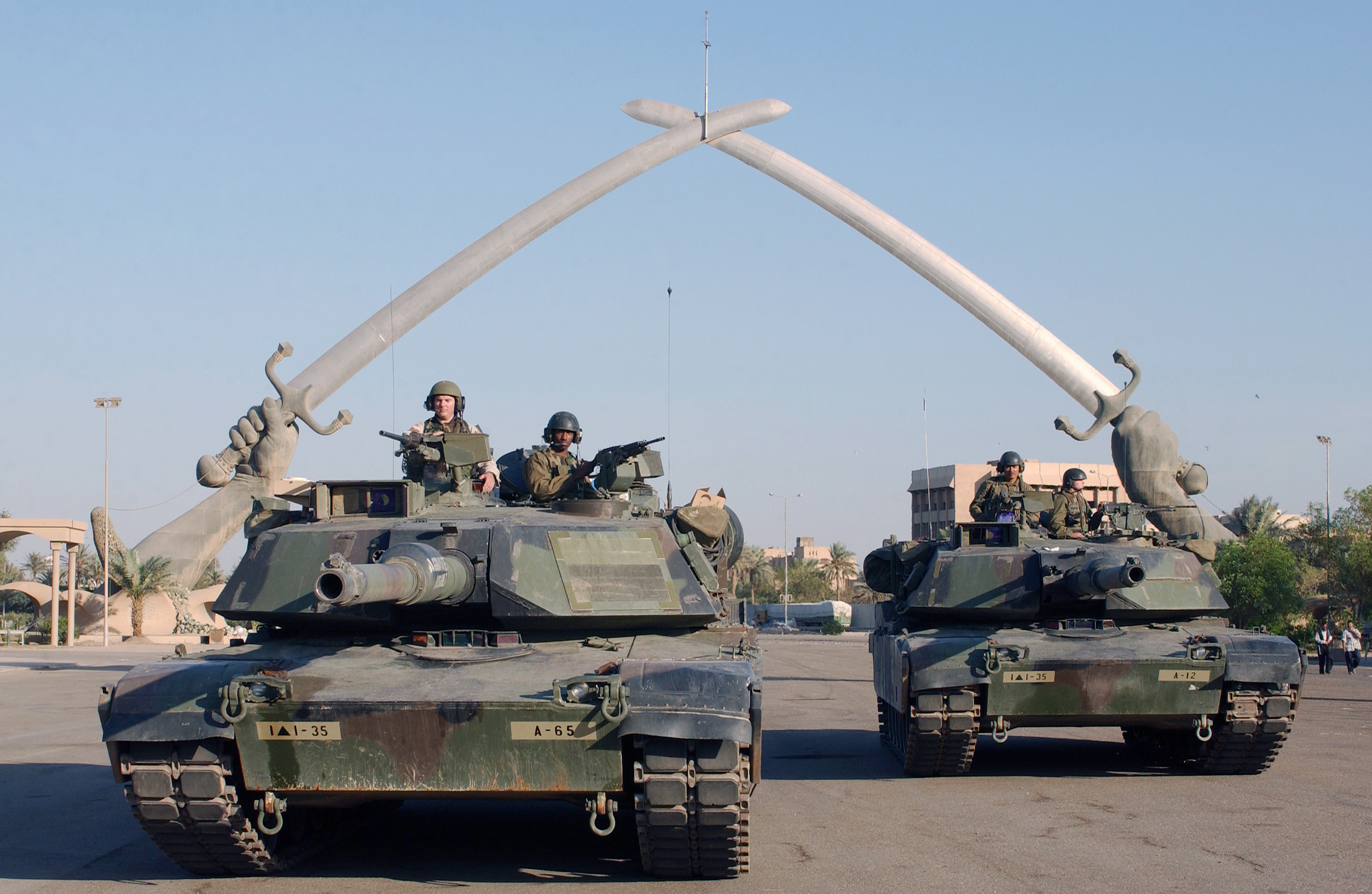
U.S. Army M1A1 Abrams tanks and their crews pose for a photo in front of the "Victory Arch" monument at Baghdad's Ceremony Square in November 2003.

This plan soon became unnecessary, as an initial engagement of armored units south of the city saw most of the Republican Guard's assets destroyed and routes in the southern outskirts of the city occupied. On 5 April, Task Force 1–64 Armor of the U.S. Army's 3rd Infantry Division executed a raid, later called the "Thunder Run", to test remaining Iraqi defenses, with 29 tanks and 14 Bradley armored fighting vehicles advancing to the Baghdad airport. They met significant resistance, but were successful in reaching the airport, and eventually secured it after heavy fighting.

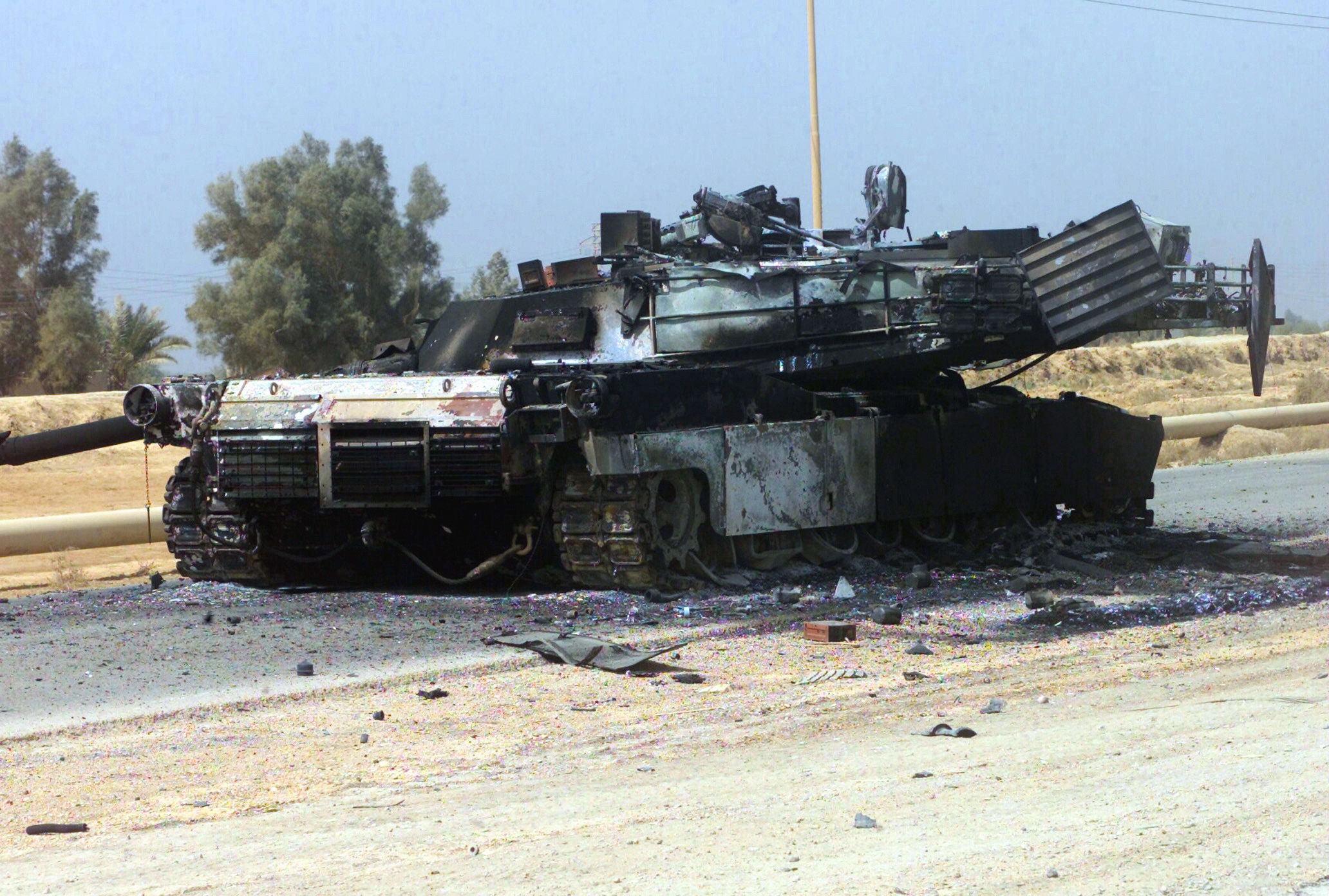
An American M1 Abrams tank destroyed in Baghdad

The next day, another brigade of the 3rd Infantry Division attacked downtown Baghdad and occupied one of the palaces of Saddam Hussein in fierce fighting. U.S. Marines also faced heavy shelling from Iraqi artillery as they attempted to cross a river bridge, but the river crossing was successful. The Iraqis managed to inflict some casualties on the U.S. forces near the airport from defensive positions but suffered severe casualties from air bombardment. Within hours of the palace seizure and with television coverage of this spreading through Iraq, U.S. forces ordered Iraqi forces within Baghdad to surrender, or the city would face a full-scale assault. Iraqi government officials had either disappeared or had conceded defeat.

On 9 April 2003, Baghdad was formally occupied by coalition forces, and a statue of Saddam was toppled. Much of Baghdad remained unsecured, however, and fighting continued within the city and its outskirts well into the period of occupation. Saddam had vanished, and his whereabouts were unknown.

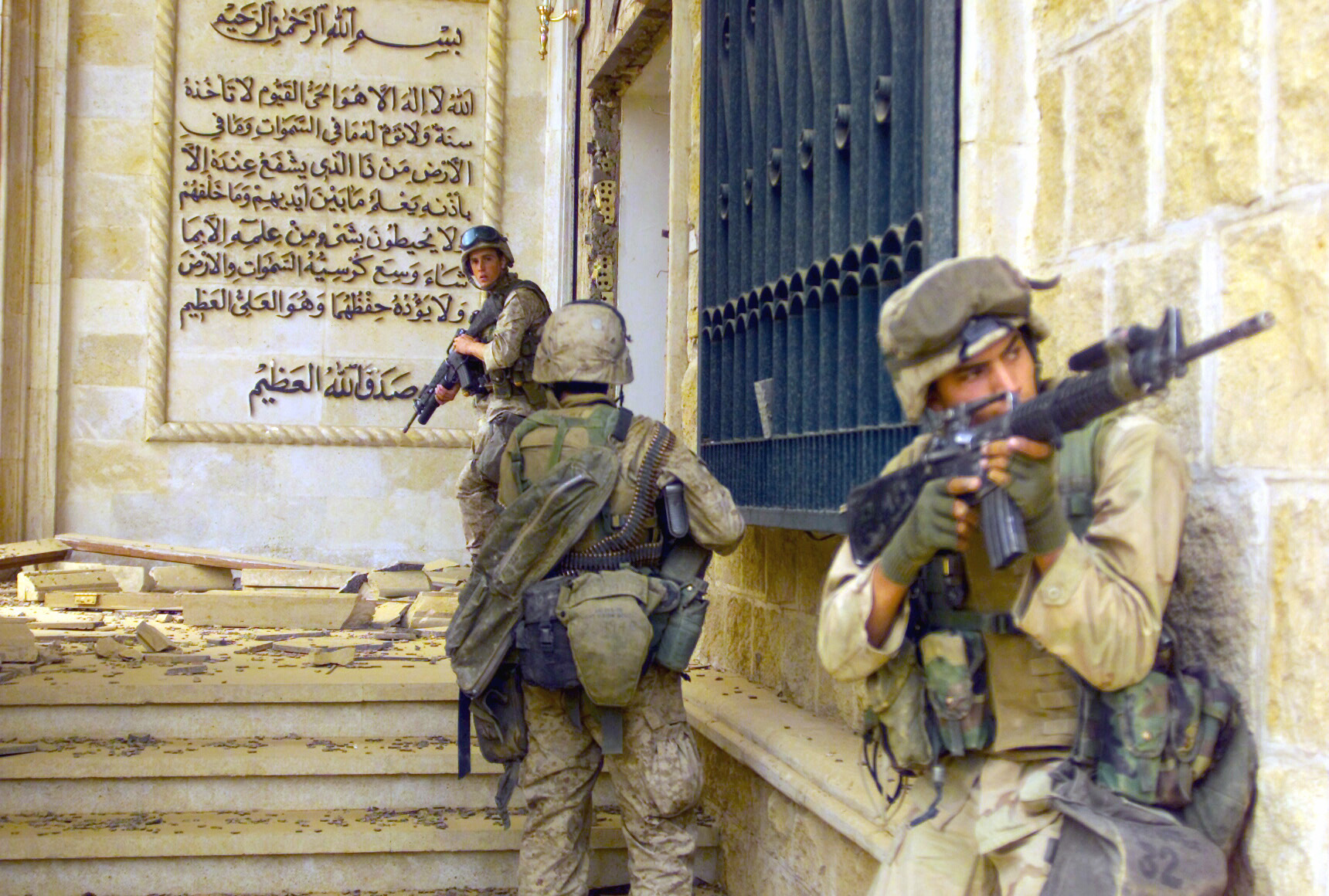
Marines from 1st Battalion 7th Marines enter a palace during the Battle of Baghdad

On 10 April, a rumor emerged that Saddam Hussein and his top aides were in a mosque complex in the Al Az'Amiyah District of Baghdad. Three companies of Marines were sent to capture him and came under heavy fire from rocket-propelled grenades, mortars, and assault rifles. One Marine was killed and 20 were wounded, but neither Saddam or any of his top aides were found. U.S. forces supported by mortars, artillery, and aircraft continued to attack Iraqi forces still loyal to Saddam Hussein and non-Iraqi Arab volunteers. U.S. aircraft flying in support were met with Iraqi anti-aircraft fire. On 12 April, by late afternoon, all fighting had ceased. A total of 34 American soldiers and 2,320 Iraqi fighters were killed.

Many Iraqis celebrated the downfall of Saddam by vandalizing the many portraits and statues of him together with other pieces of his cult of personality. One widely publicized event was the dramatic toppling of a large statue of Saddam in Baghdad's Firdos Square. This attracted considerable media coverage at the time. As the British Daily Mirror reported,

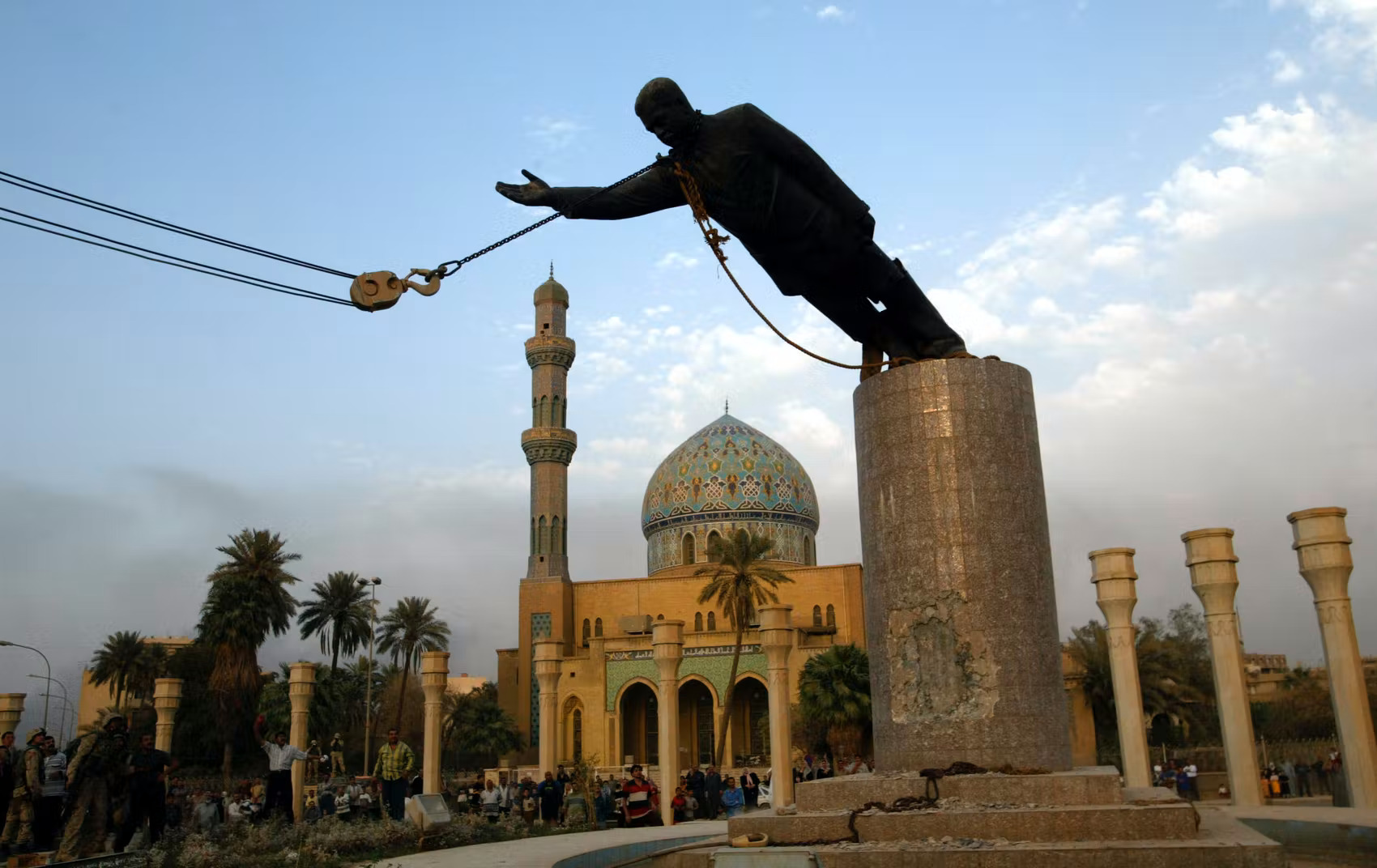
The April 2003 toppling of Saddam Hussein's statue in Firdos Square in Baghdad shortly after the capture of the city

For an oppressed people this final act in the fading daylight, the wrenching down of this ghastly symbol of the regime, is their Berlin Wall moment. Big Moustache has had his day."

The fall of Baghdad saw the outbreak of regional, sectarian violence throughout the country, as Iraqi tribes and cities began to fight each other over old grudges. The Iraqi cities of Al-Kut and Nasiriyah launched attacks on each other immediately following the fall of Baghdad to establish dominance in the new country, and the U.S.-led coalition quickly found themselves embroiled in a potential civil war. U.S.-led coalition forces ordered the cities to cease hostilities immediately, explaining that Baghdad would remain the capital of the new Iraqi government. Nasiriyah responded favorably and quickly backed down; however, Al-Kut placed snipers on the main roadways into town, with orders that invading forces were not to enter the city. After several minor skirmishes, the snipers were removed, but tensions and violence between regional, city, tribal, and familial groups continued.

U.S. Marines being welcomed while entering Baghdad in April 2003

Tommy Franks assumed control of Iraq as the supreme commander of the coalition occupation forces. Shortly after the sudden collapse of the defense of Baghdad, rumors were circulating in Iraq and elsewhere that there had been a deal struck (a "safqua") wherein the U.S.-led coalition had bribed key members of the Iraqi military elite and/or the Ba'ath party itself to stand down. In May 2003, Franks retired, and confirmed in an interview that the U.S.-led coalition had paid Iraqi military leaders to defect. The extent of the defections and their effect on the war are unclear.

U.S.-led coalition troops promptly began searching for the key members of Saddam's government. These individuals were identified by a variety of means, most famously through sets of most-wanted Iraqi playing cards. Later during the military occupation period after the invasion, on 22 July during a raid by the U.S. 101st Airborne Division and men from Task Force 20, Uday and Qusay Hussein, as well as one of Saddam's grandsons were killed in a massive fire-fight. Saddam himself was captured on 13 December.

=== Other areas ===
On 15 April, U.S. forces took control of Tikrit, the last major outpost in central Iraq, with an attack led by the Marines' Task Force Tripoli. About a week later, the Marines were relieved in place by the Army's 4th Infantry Division.

Coalition aircraft flew over 41,000 sorties, of which over 9,000 were tanker sorties.

== Immediate aftermath of the invasion ==
After the invasion, several factors contributed to the destabilization of Iraq. On 23 May, L. Paul Bremer issued Coalition Provisional Authority Order Number 2, dissolving the Iraqi Army and other entities of the Ba'athist state. Ba'athists were excluded from the newly formed Iraqi government. The first postwar election was won by the United Iraqi Alliance, an electoral coalition composed of mainly Shi’ite groups, which proceeded to ostracize Sunnis. Shia militia groups pushed Sunnis out of several areas, even emptying entire Sunni neighborhoods in Baghdad during the 2007 troop surge. The U.S. military established prison camps where disgruntled Iraqis, former Ba'athists, and jihadists met. Abu Bakr al-Baghdadi, future leader of the Islamic State, joined al-Qaeda in Iraq (AQI) while detained at Camp Bucca in 2004. AQI member Ahmed al-Sharaa, the future leader of al-Nusra Front and Hay'at Tahrir al-Sham, and future Syrian president, was also held there and released in 2008. All these factors contributed to Iraq's sectarian violence and the formation and spread of terrorist organizations.

=== Bush declares an end to major combat operations (May 2003) ===
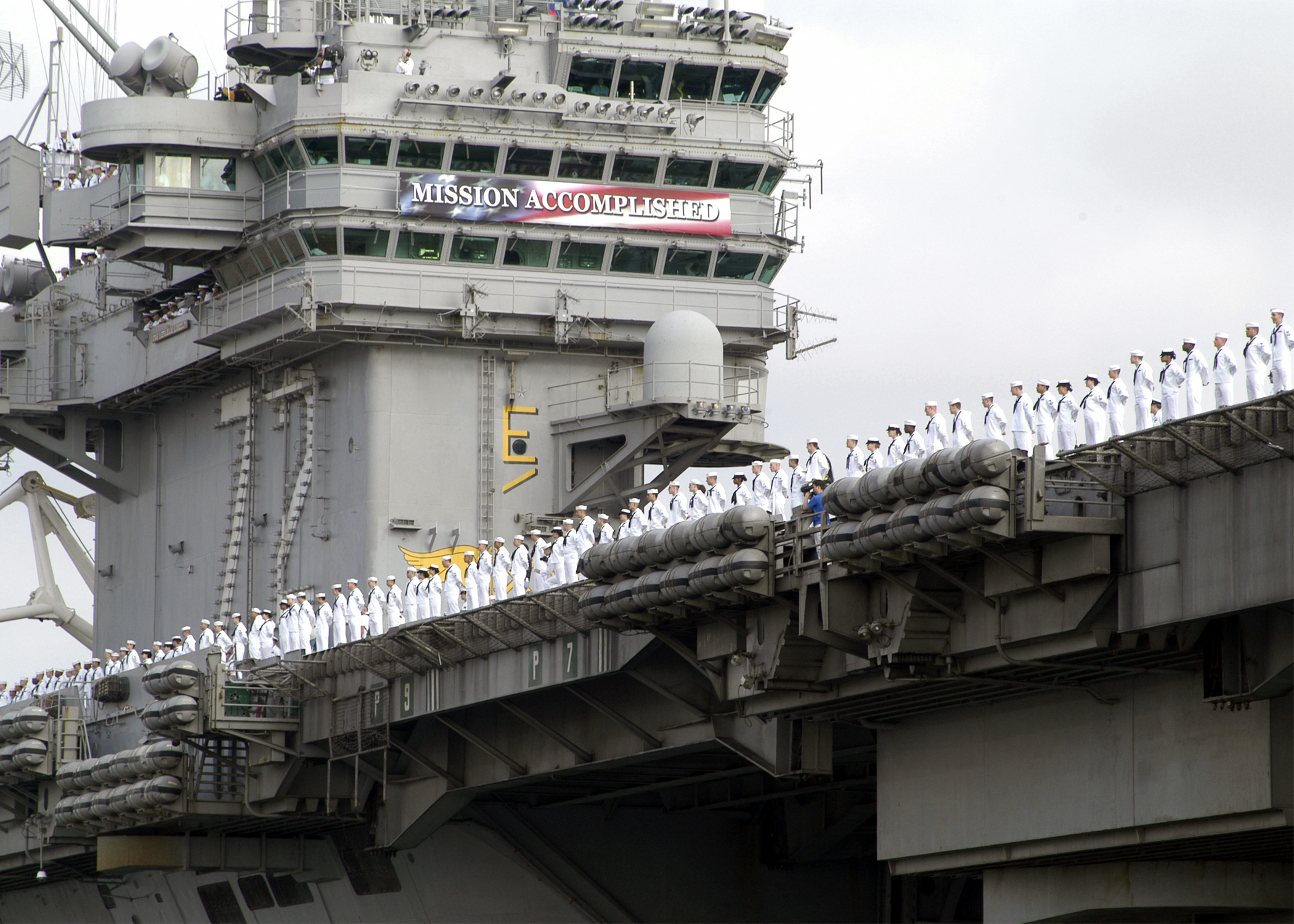
USS Abraham Lincoln returning to port carrying its Mission Accomplished banner

On 1 May 2003, Bush gave a speech on the aircraft carrier USS Abraham Lincoln, announcing the end of major combat operations in the Iraq war. While he gave the speech, there was a banner hanging behind him that wrote "Mission Accomplished". The banner, made by White House staff at the request of the U.S. Navy, was criticized as premature. The White House subsequently released a statement that the sign and Bush's visit referred to the initial invasion of Iraq, and disputing the charge of theatrics. The speech itself noted: "We have difficult work to do in Iraq. We are bringing order to parts of that country that remain dangerous." Post-invasion Iraq was marked by a long conflict between U.S.-led forces and Iraqi insurgents.

== Coalition and Allied contingent involvement ==
The "coalition of the willing" named by the US State Department in 2003.

Members of the coalition included Australia: 2,000 invasion, Poland: 200 invasion—2,500 peak, Spain: 1,300 invasion, UK: 46,000 invasion, U.S.: 150,000 to 250,000 invasion. Other members of the coalition were Afghanistan, Albania, Angola, Azerbaijan, Bulgaria, Colombia, Costa Rica, the Czech Republic, Denmark, Dominican Republic, El Salvador, Eritrea, Estonia, Ethiopia, Georgia, Honduras, Hungary, Iceland, Italy, Japan, Kuwait, Latvia, Lithuania, North Macedonia, Marshall Islands, Micronesia, Mongolia, the Netherlands, Nicaragua, Palau, Panama, the Philippines, Portugal, Romania, Rwanda, Singapore, Slovakia, Solomon Islands, South Korea, Tonga, Turkey, Uganda, Ukraine, and Uzbekistan. Fifteen other countries were "providing assistance, such as over-flight rights, but which do not want to declare support."

=== Australia ===
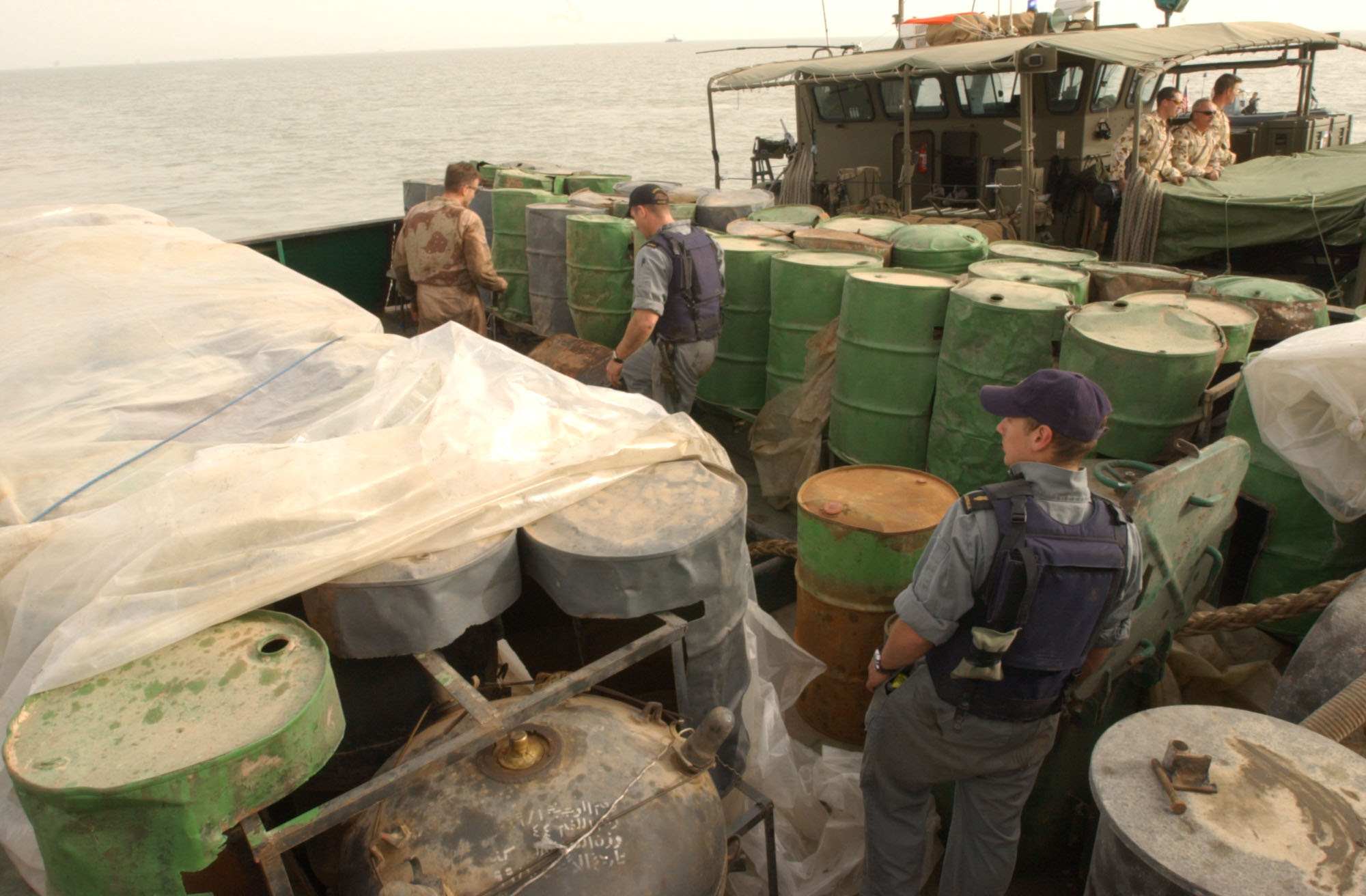
Members of the RAN Clearance Diving Team Three and an Australian Army LCM-8 inspecting camouflaged mines, 21 March 2003.

Australia contributed approximately 2,000 Australian Defence Force personnel, including a special forces task group, three warships and 14 F/A-18 Hornet aircraft. On 16 April 2003, Australian special operations forces captured the undefended Al Asad air base west of Baghdad. The base would later become the second largest coalition facility post-invasion.

During the naval campaign, the three warships deployed (HMAS Kanimbla, Darwin, and Anzac) formed a critical part within the Maritime Interception Force. HMAS Kanimbla served as the command flagship for the entire coalition's interception screen, orchestrating boarding parties that seized hundreds of Iraqi vessels attempting to run the blockade or lay sea mines.

On 21 March 2003, HMAS Anzac provided direct Naval Gunfire Support during the invasion, utilising it's 5-inch gun to support the British 40 Commando, Royal Marines, during their amphibious assault on the Al Faw Peninsula. Over a three-day period, Anzac executed seven successful fire support missions, neutralising Iraqi bunkers, artillery positions, and troop concentrations. The high amount of shelling on the opening day of the assault earned the action the nickname "Five-Inch Friday" among the ship's crew. The deployment was commemorated by an engraved 5 inch combat shell casing bearing the names of all 175 crew members, and is currently preserved in the Australian War Memorial in Canberra.

Following the initial combat combat phase, HMAS Sydney (IV) arrived in the region on 29 April 2003 to maintain the post-war blockade, famously conducting 82 boardings in 82 days, solidifying her and the RAN's reputation as the most efficient in maritime boarding operations throughout the Iraq War.

=== Poland ===
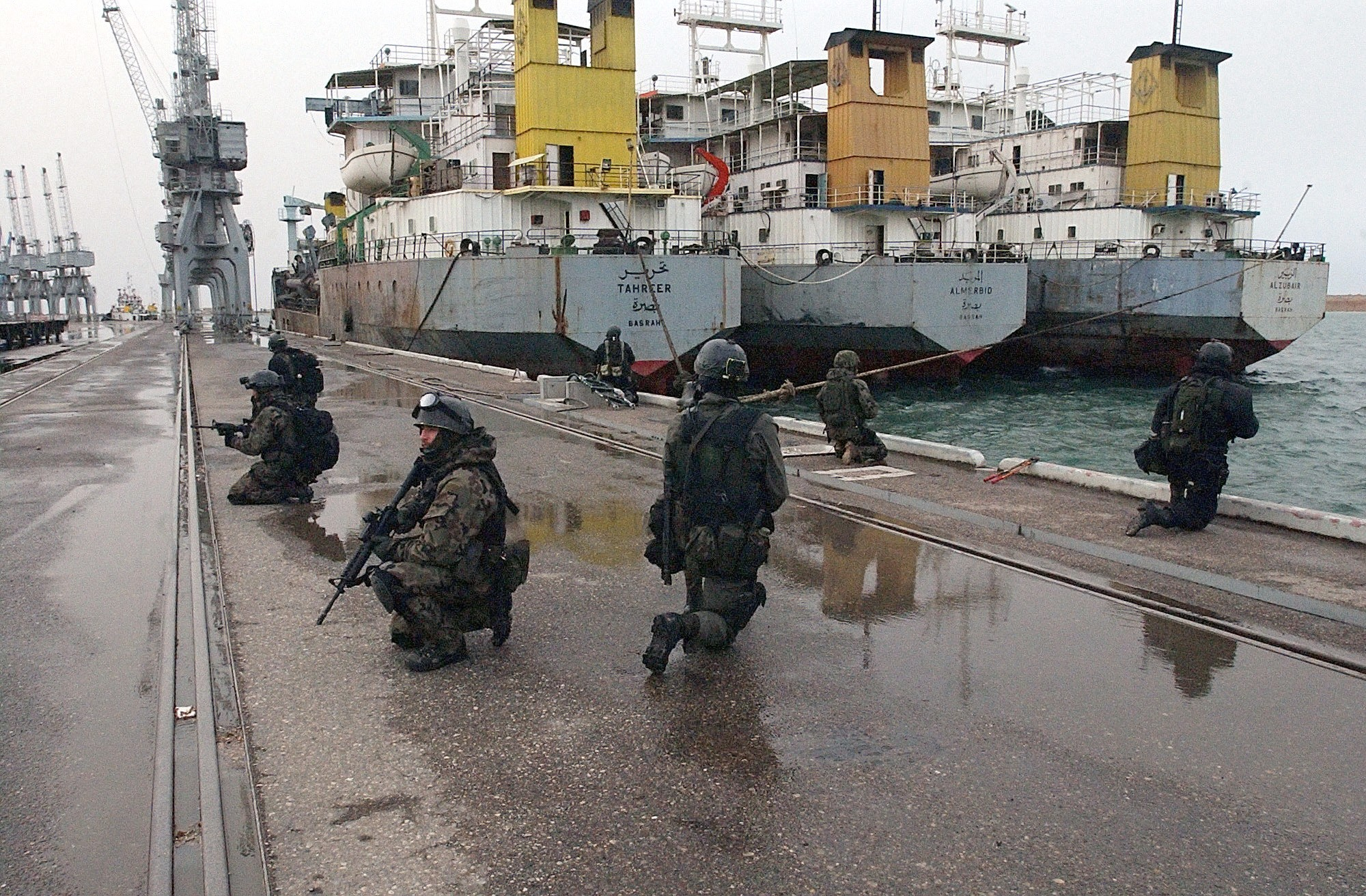
Polish GROM troops immediately after the port's capture during the Battle of Umm Qasr

The Battle of Umm Qasr was the first military confrontation in the Iraq War, with its objective the capture of the port. Polish GROM troops supported the amphibious assault on Umm Qasr with the British 3 Commando Brigade of the Royal Marines, and the U.S. 15th Marine Expeditionary Unit. After the waterway was de-mined by a Detachment from HM-14 and Naval Special Clearance Team ONE of the U.S. Navy and reopened, Umm Qasr played an important role in the shipment of humanitarian supplies to Iraqi civilians.

=== United Kingdom ===
In Operation TELIC, British troops participated in the invasion. The 1st Armoured Division was deployed to the Persian Gulf and commanded British forces in the area, securing areas in southern Iraq, including the city of Basra during the invasion. A total of 46,000 troops of all the British services were committed to the operation at its start, including some 5,000 Royal Navy and Royal Fleet Auxiliary sailors and 4,000 Royal Marines, 26,000 British Army soldiers, and 8,100 RAF airmen. The British special forces deployment was codenamed Operation Row and were known as Task Force 7 under Combined Joint Special Operations Task Force-West (Task Force Dagger).

== Summary of the invasion ==
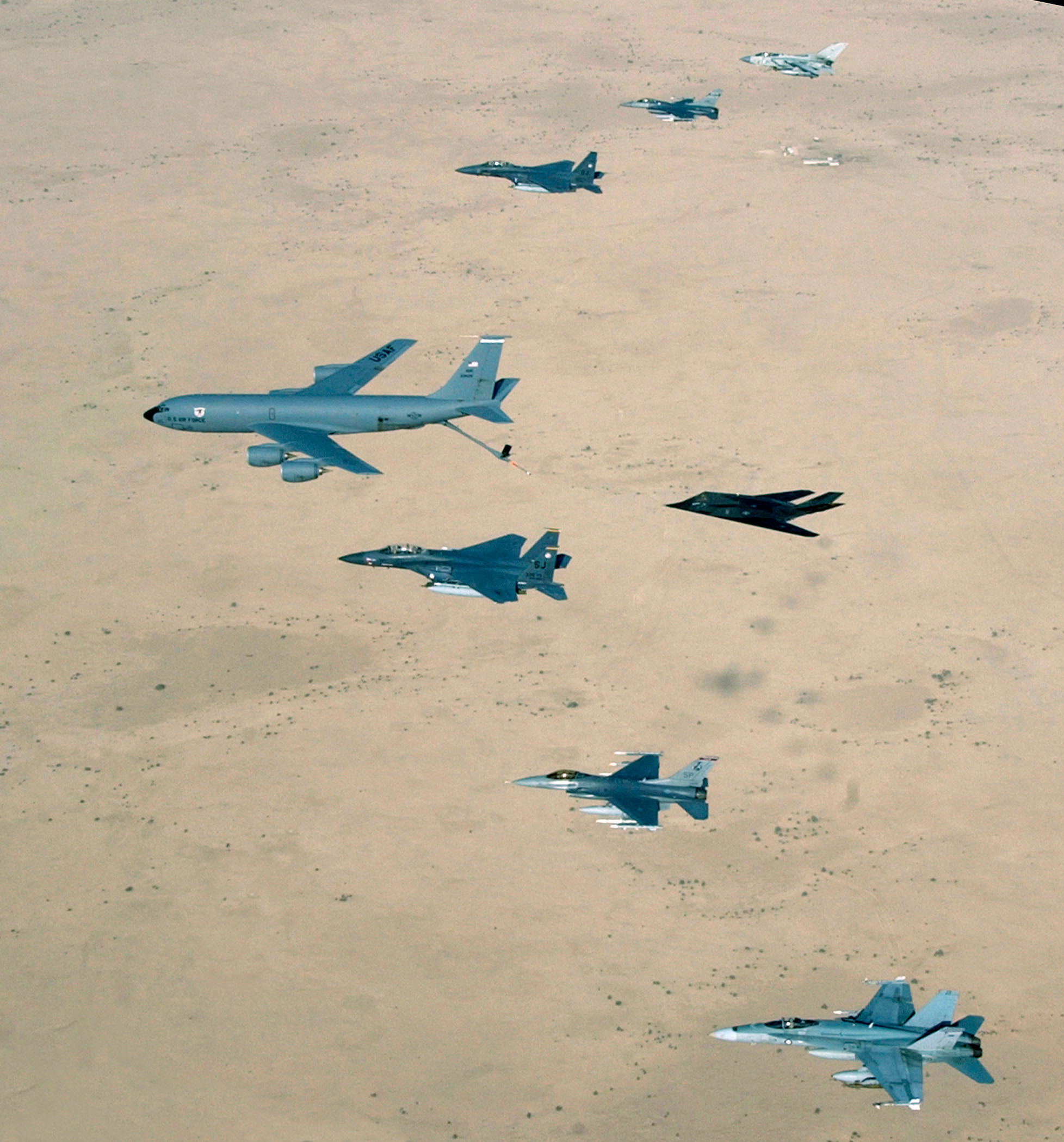
American, British, and Australian counterparts stationed together at Al Udeid Air Base, Qatar, flying on 14 April 2003

The U.S.-led coalition forces toppled the government and captured the key cities of a large nation in only 26 days. The invasion did require a large army build-up like the 1991 Gulf War, but many did not see combat and many were withdrawn after the invasion ended. This proved to be short-sighted, however, due to the requirement for a much larger force to combat the irregular Iraqi forces in the Iraqi insurgency. General Eric Shinseki, U.S. Army Chief of Staff, recommended "several hundred thousand" troops be used to maintain post-war order, but then Rumsfeld—and especially his deputy, civilian Paul Wolfowitz—strongly disagreed. General Abizaid later said General Shinseki had been right.

The Iraqi army, armed mainly with older Soviet and Eastern European built equipment, was overall ill-equipped in comparison to the American and British forces. Attacks on U.S. supply routes by Fedayeen militiamen were repulsed. The Iraqis' artillery proved largely ineffective, and they were unable to mobilize their air force to attempt a defense. The Iraqi T-72 tanks, the most powerful armored vehicles in the Iraqi army, were both outdated and ill-maintained, and when they were mobilized they were rapidly destroyed, thanks in part to the coalition air supremacy. The U.S. Air Force, Marine Corps and Naval Aviation, and RAF operated with impunity throughout the country, pinpointing heavily defended resistance targets and destroying them before ground troops arrived. The main battle tanks of American and British forces, the U.S. M1 Abrams and British Challenger 2, functioned well in the rapid advance across the country. Despite the many RPG attacks by irregular Iraqi forces, few U.S. and UK tanks were lost, and no tank crew-members were killed by hostile fire, although nearly 40 M1 Abrams were damaged in the attacks. The only tank loss sustained by the British Army was a Challenger 2 of the Queen's Royal Lancers that was hit by another Challenger 2, killing two crew members.

The Iraqi army suffered from poor morale, even among the elite Republican Guard. Entire units disbanded into the crowds upon the approach of invading troops, or actually sought out American and British forces to surrender to. Many Iraqi commanding officers were bribed by the CIA or coerced into surrendering. The leadership of the Iraqi army was incompetent – reports state that Qusay Hussein, charged with the defense of Baghdad, dramatically shifted the positions of the two main divisions protecting Baghdad several times in the days before the arrival of U.S. forces, and as a result the units were confused, and further demoralized when American forces attacked. The invasion force did not see the entire Iraqi military thrown against it; American and British units had orders to move to and seize objective target points rather than seek to engage Iraqi units. This resulted in most regular Iraqi military units emerging from the war without having been engaged, and fully intact, especially in southern Iraq. It is assumed that most units disintegrated to return to their homes.

According to a declassified Pentagon report, "The largest contributing factor to the complete defeat of Iraq's military forces was the continued interference by Saddam." The report, designed to help American officials understand in hindsight how Saddam and his military commanders prepared for and fought the invasion, paints a picture of an Iraqi government blind to the threat it faced, hampered by Saddam's inept military leadership and deceived by its own propaganda and inability to believe an invasion was imminent without further Iraqi provocation. The report portrays Saddam Hussein as "chronically out of touch with reality – preoccupied with the prevention of domestic unrest and with the threat posed by Iran."

== Casualties ==
=== Death toll ===
Estimates on the number of casualties during the invasion in Iraq vary widely. Estimates on civilian casualties are more variable than those for military personnel. Approximately 7,500 civilians were killed during the invasion phase. The Project on Defense Alternatives study estimated that 3,200–4,300 civilians died during the invasion.

=== War crimes and allegations ===
Fedayeen Saddam militia, Republican Guard, and Iraqi security forces were reported to have executed Iraqi soldiers who tried to surrender on multiple occasions, as well as threatening the families of those who refused to fight. One such incident was directly observed during the Battle of Debecka Pass.

Many incidents of Fedayeen fighters using human shields were reported from various towns in Iraq. Iraqi Republican Guard units were also reported to be using human shields. Some reports indicate that the Fedayeen used ambulances to deliver messages and transport fighters into combat. On 31 March, Fedayeen in a Red Crescent-marked ambulance attacked American soldiers outside Nasiriyah, wounding three. During the Battle of Basra, British forces of the Black Watch reported that on 28 March, Fedayeen forces opened fire on thousands of civilian refugees fleeing the city.

After the ambush of the 507th Maintenance Company during the Battle of Nasiriyah on 23 March, the bodies of several Americans soldiers who had been killed in the ambush were shown on Iraqi television. Some of these soldiers had visible gunshot wounds to the head, leading to speculation that they had been executed. Except for Sgt. Donald Walters, no evidence has since surfaced to support this scenario and it is generally accepted that the soldiers were killed in action. Five live prisoners of war were also interviewed on the air, a violation of the Third Geneva Convention. Sergeant Walters was initially reported to have been killed in the ambush after killing several Fedayeen before running out of ammunition. However, an eyewitness later reported that he had seen Walters being guarded by several Fedayeen in front of a building. Forensics work later found Walters' blood in front of the building and blood spatter suggesting he died from two gunshot wounds to the back at close range. This led the Army to conclude that Walters had been executed after being captured, and he was posthumously awarded the Prisoner of War Medal in 2004. It was alleged in the authorized biography of Pfc. Jessica Lynch that she was raped by her captors after her capture, based on medical reports and the pattern of her injuries, though this is not supported by Lynch. Mohammed Odeh al-Rehaief, who later helped American forces rescue Lynch, stated that he saw an Iraqi Colonel slap Lynch while she was in her hospital bed. The staff at the hospital where Lynch was held later denied both stories, saying that Lynch was well cared for. While Lynch suffers from amnesia due to her injuries, she denied any mistreatment while in captivity.

Also on 23 March, a British Army engineering unit made a wrong turn near the town of Az Zubayr, which was still held by Iraqi forces. The unit was ambushed and Sapper Luke Allsopp and Staff Sergeant Simon Cullingworth became separated from the rest. Both were captured and executed by Iraqi irregular forces. In 2006, a video of Allsopp lying on the ground surrounded by Iraqi irregular forces was discovered.

During the Battle of Nasiriyah, Iraqi irregulars feigned surrender to approach an American unit securing a bridge. After getting close to the soldiers, the Iraqis suddenly opened fire, killing 10 soldiers and wounding 40. In response, American forces reinforced security procedures for dealing with prisoners of war.

Marine Sergeant Fernando Padilla-Ramirez was reported missing from his supply unit after an ambush north of Nasiriyah on 28 March. His body was later dragged through the streets of Ash-Shatrah and hung in the town square, and later taken down and buried by sympathetic locals. The corpse was discovered by U.S. forces on 10 April.

In 2023, Amnesty International released a report calling for accountability and reparations for human rights violations perpetrated by the coalition during the invasion and subsequent occupation between 2003 and 2011. They cited violations of international humanitarian law including secret prisons, torture and other cruel treatment of detainees, indiscriminate attacks that killed and injured civilians, and forced disappearances. The report stated that both Bush and Rumsfeld had publicly confessed to involvement in secret detentions and faced no criminal accountability. The report also noted that despite the conclusions of the International Criminal Court in 2020 that British forces had committed war crimes in Iraq, including deliberate killings, rape and torture, no senior British officials have been held criminally accountable.

== Security, looting and war damage ==
Massive looting took place in the days following the 2003 invasion. According to U.S. officials, the "reality of the situation on the ground" was that hospitals, water plants, and ministries with vital intelligence needed security more than other sites. There were only enough U.S. troops on the ground to guard a certain number of the many sites that ideally needed protection, and so some "hard choices" were made.

It was reported that The Iraq Museum was among the looted sites. The director at the time was archaeologist Nawala Al-Mutawalli. The FBI was soon called into Iraq to track down the stolen items. It was found that the initial allegations of looting of substantial portions of the collection were heavily exaggerated. Initial reports asserted a near-total looting of the museum, estimated at upwards of 170,000 inventory lots, or about 501,000 pieces. The more recent estimate places the number of stolen pieces at around 15,000, and about 10,000 of them probably were taken in an "inside job" before U.S. troops arrived, according to Bogdanos. Over 5,000 looted items have since been recovered. An assertion that U.S. forces did not guard the museum because they were guarding the Ministry of Oil and Ministry of Interior is disputed by investigator Colonel Matthew Bogdanos in his 2005 book Thieves of Baghdad. Bogdanos notes that the Ministry of Oil building was bombed, but the museum complex, which took some fire, was not bombed. He also writes that Saddam Hussein's troops set up sniper's nests inside and on top of the museum, and nevertheless U.S. Marines and soldiers stayed close enough to prevent wholesale looting.

"Two great libraries, with priceless ancient collections"—the Awqaf Library (Library of the Ministry of Religious Endowments) and the National Library of Iraq and National Centre for Archives (the House of Wisdom)—"have been burned," The Boston Globe reported in 2003, adding that the libraries at the University of Mosul and University of Basra had been looted. András Riedlmayer, a specialist in Islamic architecture at Harvard University, said the U.S. State Department had asked him for advice before the invasion, and that "everybody warned them that the greatest danger was not from Tomahawk missiles but from looting." Keith D. Waterpaugh, a specialist in Ottoman history, said, "If we are going to help the Iraqi people build a new nation, we don't do it by letting their past be destroyed."

More serious for the post-war state of Iraq was the looting of cached weaponry and ordnance which fueled the subsequent insurgency. As many as 250,000 tons of explosives were unaccounted for by October 2004. Disputes within the U.S. Defense Department led to delays in the post-invasion assessment and protection of Iraqi nuclear facilities. Tuwaitha, the Iraqi site most scrutinized by UN inspectors since 1991, was left unguarded and was looted.

Ancient history professor Zainab Bahrani reported that a helicopter landing pad was constructed in the center of the ancient city of Babylon, and "removed layers of archeological earth from the site. The daily flights of the helicopters rattle the ancient walls and the winds created by their rotors blast sand against the fragile bricks. When my colleague [and] I asked military personnel in charge that the helipad be shut down, the response was that it had to remain open for security reasons, for the safety of the troops." Bahrani also reported that in the summer of 2004, "the wall of the Temple of Nabu and the roof of the Temple of Ninmah, both sixth century BC, collapsed as a result of the movement of helicopters." Electrical power was scarce in post-war Iraq, Bahrani reported, and some fragile artifacts, including the Ottoman Archive, would not survive the loss of refrigeration.

== Media coverage ==
=== U.S. media coverage ===
A study found that in the lead up to the Iraq War, most U.S. sources were overwhelmingly in favor of the invasion.

As of 2007, the invasion was the most widely and closely reported war in military history. Television network coverage was largely pro-war and viewers were six times more likely to see a pro-war source as one who was anti-war. The New York Times ran a number of articles describing Saddam Hussein's attempts to build weapons of mass destruction. The 8 September 2002 article titled "U.S. Says Hussein Intensifies Quest for A-Bomb Parts" was later discredited, leading The New York Times to issue a public statement admitting it was not as rigorous as it should have been.

At the start of the war, as many as 775 reporters and photographers were traveling as embedded journalists. These reporters signed contracts with the military that limited what they were allowed to report on. When asked why the military decided to embed journalists with the troops, Lt. Col. Rick Long of the U.S. Marine Corps replied, "Frankly, our job is to win the war. Part of that is information warfare. So we are going to attempt to dominate the information environment."

In 2003, a study released by Fairness & Accuracy in Reporting stated the network news disproportionately focused on pro-war sources and left out many anti-war sources. According to the study, 64% of total sources supported the war, while total anti-war sources made up 10% of the media (only 3% of U.S. sources were anti-war). The study looked only at six American news networks after 20 March for three weeks. The study stated that "viewers were more than six times as likely to see a pro-war source as one who was anti-war; with U.S. guests alone, the ratio increases to 25 to 1."

A September 2003 poll revealed that 70% of Americans believed Saddam was involved in 9/11. 80% of Fox News viewers were found to hold at least one such belief about the invasion, compared to 23% of PBS viewers. Ted Turner, founder of CNN, charged that Rupert Murdoch was using Fox News to advocate an invasion. Critics argued that this statistic is indicative of misleading coverage by the U.S. media, since viewers in other countries were less likely to have these beliefs. A post-2008 election poll by FactCheck.org found that 48% of Americans believed Saddam played a role in 9/11, the group concluded that "voters, once deceived, tend to stay that way despite all evidence."

=== Independent media coverage ===
Independent media also played a prominent role in covering the invasion. The Indymedia network, among many other independent networks including many journalists from the invading countries, provided reports on the Iraq war. In the U.S., the radio program Democracy Now was critical of the invasion, and crimes committed by the U.S. in Iraq.

The Israeli Military Censor have released gag orders to Fresh and Rotter news platforms preventing them releasing any information about events and action related to the invasion.

On the other side, among media not opposing to the invasion, The Economist reported that "the normal diplomatic tools—sanctions, persuasion, pressure, UN resolutions—have all been tried, during 12 deadly but failed years" then giving a mild conditional support to the war, stating that if Saddam "refuses to disarm, it would be right to go to war".

Australian war artist George Gittoes collected independent interviews with soldiers while producing his documentary Soundtrack To War. The Iraq War provided the first time in history that military on the front lines were able to provide direct, uncensored reportage themselves, thanks to blogging software and the reach of the internet. Dozens of such reporting sites, known as soldier blogs or milblogs, were started during the war. These blogs were more often than not largely pro-war and stated various reasons why the soldiers and Marines felt they were doing the right thing.

=== International media coverage ===
International coverage of the war differed from coverage in the U.S. in a number of ways. Arab-language news channel Al Jazeera and the German satellite channel Deutsche Welle featured almost twice as much information on the political background of the war. Al Jazeera also showed scenes of civilian casualties and insurgent attacks rarely seen in the U.S. media.

== Criticism ==
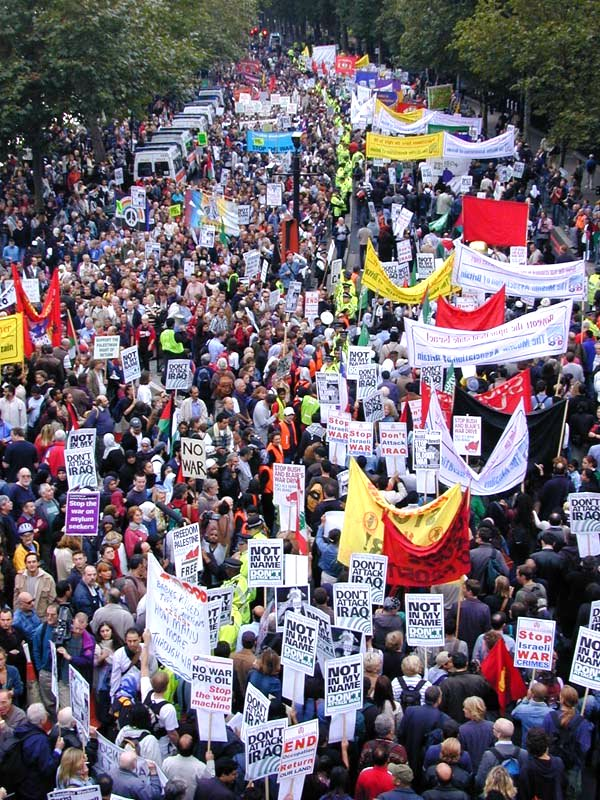
Anti war protest in London, 2002

Opponents of the invasion criticized it by referring the human cost of war; by arguing that the war was illegal, that little evidence could justify it, that Iraq could still be negotiated with, or that the U.S. had more pressing security priorities (i.e., Afghanistan and North Korea); and by predicting that it would destabilize the Middle East.

=== Rationale based on faulty evidence ===
The central U.S. justification for launching the war was that Saddam's alleged development of nuclear and biological weapons and purported ties to al-Qaeda made his regime a "grave and growing" threat to the U.S. and international community. During the lead-up to the war and the aftermath of the invasion, critics cast doubt on the evidence supporting this rationale. Concerning Iraq's weapons programs, prominent critics included Scott Ritter, a former UN weapons inspector who argued in 2002 that inspections had eliminated the nuclear and chemical weapons programs, and that evidence of their reconstitution would "have been eminently detectable by intelligence services ..." Although it is popularly believed that Saddam had forced the IAEA weapons inspectors to leave Iraq, they were withdrawn at the request of the U.S. before Operation Desert Fox. After the build-up of U.S. troops in neighboring states, Saddam welcomed them back and promised complete cooperation with their demands. Experienced IAEA inspection teams were already back in Iraq and had made some interim reports on its search for various forms of WMD. American diplomat Joseph C. Wilson investigated the contention that Iraq had sought uranium for nuclear weapons in Niger and reported that the contention had no substance.

Similarly, alleged links between Iraq and al-Qaeda were called into question during the lead-up to the war, and were discredited by a 2004 report from U.S. Senator Carl Levin, which was later corroborated by a 2006 report from the Defense Department's inspector general. These reports further alleged that Bush administration officials, particularly former undersecretary of defense Douglas J. Feith, manipulated evidence to support links between al-Qaeda and Iraq.

During his 2003–2004 interrogation, Saddam asserted that the majority of Iraq's WMD stockpiles had been destroyed in the 1990s by UN inspectors, and the remainder were destroyed unilaterally by Iraq; the illusion of maintaining a WMD program and WMDs was maintained as a deterrent against possible Iranian invasion. An FBI agent who interrogated Saddam at this time stated in 2008 that while Iraq may not have possessed WMDs after the 1990s, Saddam likely intended to restart the WMD program if given the opportunity to do so.

=== Lack of a United Nations mandate ===
One of the main questions in the lead-up to the war was whether the UNSC would authorize military intervention in Iraq. It became increasingly clear that this authorization would require significant further weapons inspections. Many criticized their effort as unwise, immoral, and illegal. Robin Cook, then-leader of the UK House of Commons and a former foreign secretary, resigned from Blair's cabinet in protest over the UK's decision to invade without UN authorization. Cook said at the time that: "In principle, I believe it is wrong to embark on military action without broad international support. In practice, I believe it is against Britain's interests to create a precedent for unilateral military action." In addition, senior government legal advisor Elizabeth Wilmshurst resigned, stating her legal opinion that an invasion would be illegal.

UN Secretary-General Kofi Annan said in September 2004, "[F]rom our point of view, and from the Charter point of view, [the war] was illegal." This drew immediate criticism from the U.S., and was immediately played down. His annual report to the General Assembly for 2003 included no more than the statement: "Following the end of major hostilities which resulted in the occupation of Iraq..." A similar report from the UNSC was similarly terse in its reference to the event: "Following the cessation of hostilities in Iraq in April 2003 ... [we have] passed nearly 60 resolutions on Iraq and Kuwait since Iraq's invasion of Kuwait in 1990. The most relevant to this issue is Resolution 678".

=== Military intervention vs. diplomatic solution ===
Criticisms about the evidence used to justify the war notwithstanding, many opponents of military intervention objected, saying that a diplomatic solution would be preferable, and that war should be reserved as a truly last resort. This position was exemplified by French Foreign Minister Dominique de Villepin, who responded to Powell's UNSC presentation by saying that: "Given the choice between military intervention and an inspections regime that is inadequate because of a failure to cooperate on Iraq's part, we must choose the decisive reinforcement of the means of inspections." In response to Rumsfeld's reference to European countries that did not support the invasion of Iraq as 'Old Europe', Dominique de Villepin replied: "This message comes to you today from an old country, France, from a continent like mine, Europe, that has known wars, occupation and barbarity. (...) Faithful to its values, it wishes resolutely to act with all the members of the international community. It believes in our ability to build together a better world." The direct opposition between diplomatic solution and military intervention involving France and the U.S. which was personified by Chirac versus Bush, and later Powell versus de Villepin, became a milestone in the U.S.–France relations. Anti-French propaganda exploiting Francophobic clichés immediately ensued in the U.S. and UK. A call for a boycott on French wine was launched in the U.S. The New York Post claimed that France had forgotten the American "sacrifice" in 1944 France. On 20 February 2003, British newspaper The Sun published a special issue entitled "Chirac is a worm", which said that "Chirac has become the shame of Europe". The Guardian wrote that both papers expressed the opinion of their owner, Rupert Murdoch.

=== Distraction from the war on terrorism and other priorities ===
Both supporters and opponents of the Iraq War widely viewed it within the context of a post–9/11 world, where the U.S. has sought to make terrorism the defining international security paradigm. Bush often described the war as a "central front in the war on terror". Some critics of the war, particularly within the U.S. military community, argued pointedly against the conflation of Iraq and the war on terror, and criticized Bush for losing focus on the more important objective of fighting al-Qaeda. As Marine Lieutenant General Greg Newbold, the Pentagon's former top operations officer, wrote in a 2006, "I now regret that I did not more openly challenge those who were determined to invade a country whose actions were peripheral to the real threat—al-Qaeda."

Critics within this vein have further argued that containment would have been an effective strategy for the Saddam government, and that the top U.S. priorities in the Middle East should be encouraging a solution to the Israeli–Palestinian conflict, working for the moderation of Iran, and solidifying gains made in Afghanistan and Central Asia. In an October 2002 speech, Retired Marine Gen. Anthony Zinni, former head of Central Command for U.S. forces in the Middle East and State Department's envoy to the Israeli–Palestinian conflict, called Iraq "maybe six or seven," in terms of U.S. Middle East priorities, adding that "the affordability line may be drawn around five." However, while commander of CENTCOM, Zinni held a very different opinion concerning the threat posed by Iraq. In testimony before the Senate Armed Services Committee in February 2000, Zinni said: "Iraq remains the most significant near-term threat to U.S. interests in the Persian Gulf region. This is primarily due to its large conventional military force, pursuit of WMD, oppressive treatment of Iraqi citizens, refusal to comply with [UNSC resolutions], persistent threats to enforcement of the No Fly Zones (NFZ), and continued efforts to violate UN Security Council sanctions through oil smuggling." Zinni specifically referred to "the Persian Gulf region" in his Senate testimony, which is a significantly smaller region of the world than the "Middle East", which he referred to in 2007.

=== Potential to destabilize the region ===
Besides arguing that Iraq was not the top strategic priority in the war on terrorism or in the Middle East, critics of the war also suggested that it could potentially destabilize the surrounding region. Prominent among such critics was Brent Scowcroft, who served as National Security Advisor to George H. W. Bush. In a 15 August 2002 The Wall Street Journal editorial entitled "Don't attack Saddam", Scowcroft wrote that, "Possibly the most dire consequences would be the effect in the region ... there would be an explosion of outrage against us ... the results could well destabilize Arab regimes", and, "could even swell the ranks of the terrorists." In 2015, Blair apologized for his "mistakes" over Iraq War and admitted there were "elements of truth" to the view that the invasion helped promote the rise of ISIS. In the opinion of Hayder al-Khoei, Iraq was already "destined for chaos" before 2003.

== Public opinion ==
In a March 2003 Gallup poll, the day after the invasion, 76% of Americans supported the military action against Iraq. In a March YouGov poll, 54% of Britons had approved of military action against Iraq.

By 2007, opposition to the Iraq War had increased to 62% among Americans in a USA Today\Gallup poll. In 2013, a Gallup poll found that 53 percent of Americans surveyed believed the Iraq War was a mistake.

In 2023, an Axios/Ipsos poll found that 61% of Americans believed the U.S made a wrong decision by invading Iraq.

== Related phrases ==
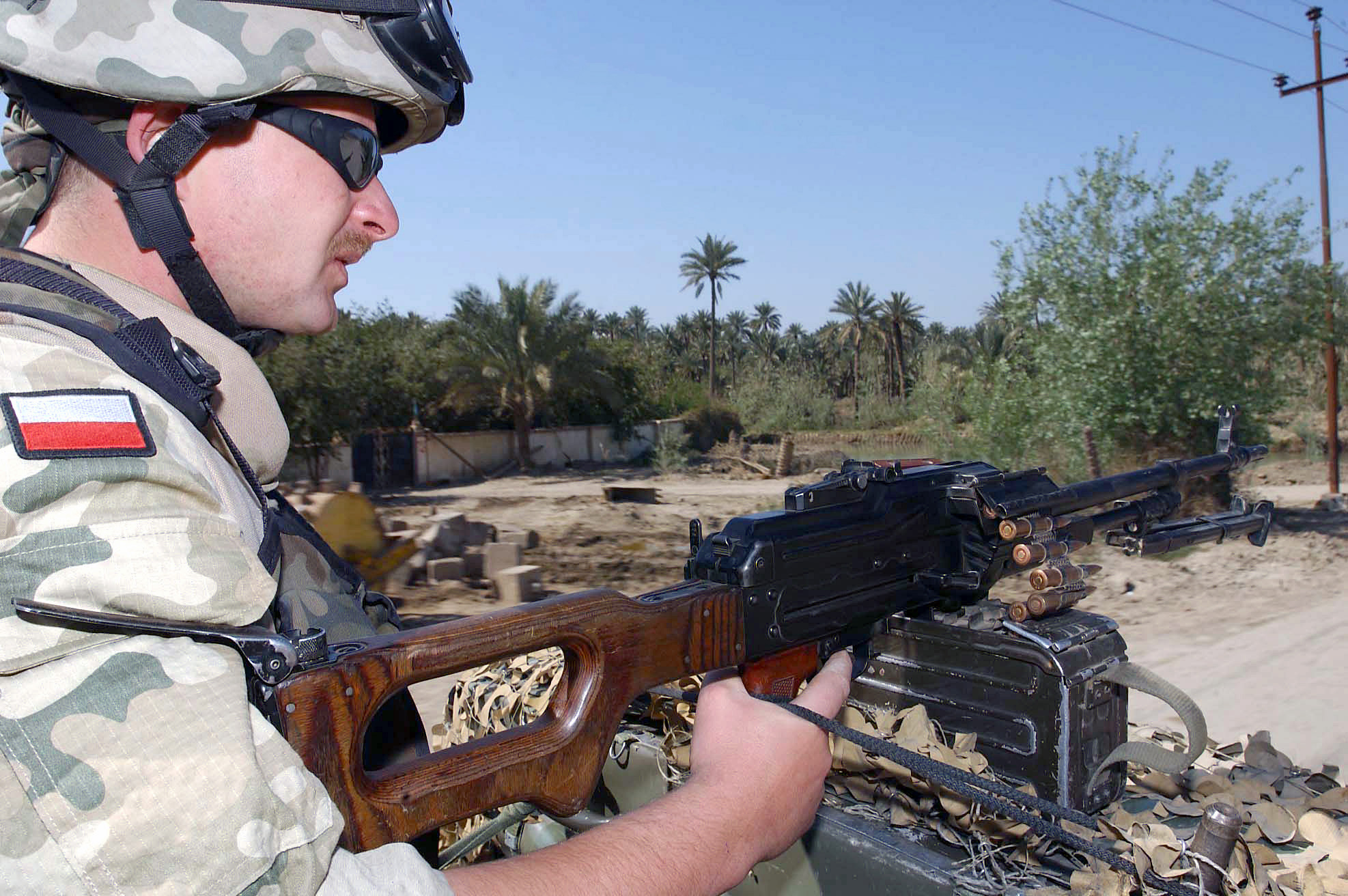
Poland was part of the "coalition of the willing"

This campaign featured a variety of new terminology, much of it initially coined by the U.S. government or military. The military official name for the invasion was Operation Iraqi Freedom. Also notable was the usage "death squads" to refer to Fedayeen paramilitary forces. Iraqi officials were given derogatory nicknames – e.g., "Chemical Ali" (Ali Hassan al-Majid), "Baghdad Bob" or "Comical Ali" (Muhammed Saeed al-Sahaf), and "Mrs. Anthrax" or "Chemical Sally" (Huda Salih Mahdi Ammash).

Terminology introduced or popularized during the war include:

- "Axis of evil", originally used by Bush in his 2002 State of the Union speech on 29 January 2002 to refer to the countries of Iran, Iraq, and North Korea.
- "Coalition of the willing", a term that originated in the Clinton era, and used by the Bush administration for the countries contributing troops in the invasion, of which the U.S. and UK were the primary members.
- "Decapitating the regime", a euphemism for killing Saddam Hussein.
- "Embedding", the American practice of assigning civilian journalists to U.S. military units.
- "Freedom fries", a euphemism for French fries invented to protest the non-participation of France.
- "Mother of all bombs", a bomb developed and produced to support Operation Iraqi Freedom. Its name echoed Saddam's phrase "Mother of all battles" to describe the Gulf War.
- "Old Europe", Rumsfeld's term for European governments not supporting the war: "You're thinking of Europe as Germany and France. I don't. I think that's old Europe."
- "Regime change", a euphemism for overthrowing a government.
- "Shock and awe", the strategy of reducing an enemy's will to fight through displays of overwhelming force.

Many slogans and terms coined came to be used by Bush's political opponents, or those opposed to the war. For example, in April 2003 John Kerry said at a campaign rally: "What we need now is not just a regime change in Saddam Hussein and Iraq, but we need a regime change in the United States."

Bush's press secretary Ari Fleischer talked about "Operation Iraqi Liberation" in a 2003 press briefing, and "Operation Iraqi Liberation (OIL)" was also used by David Rovics, a popular folk protest singer.

== See also ==
- International reactions to the prelude to the Iraq War
- Timeline of the Iraq War
- Protests against the Iraq War
- Public opinion in the United States on the invasion of Iraq
- Iraq disarmament crisis
- United Nations Security Council and the Iraq War
- 2003 invasion of Iraq order of battle
- Operation Telic order of battle

== Works cited ==
- Allen, Mike and Juliet Eilperin. Monday, 26 August 2002. Page A01 The Washington Post "Bush Aides Say Iraq War Needs No Hill Vote". Retrieved 2008-05-21.
- CNN.com/Inside Politics (2002-10-11). "Senate approves Iraq war resolution". Retrieved 6 June 2005.
- Donnelly, Thomas (2000). Rebuilding America's Defenses: Strategy, Forces and Resources For a New Century (PDF). Washington D.C.: Project for the New American Century. OCLC 223661155. Archived from the original on 8 August 2007.
- McCain, John (April 2004). "Finishing the Job in Iraq". Air & Space Forces Magazine. Vol. 87, no. 7. Archived from the original on 20 May 2025.
- Office of U.S. Representative Ron Paul (2002). "Paul Calls for Congressional Declaration of War with Iraq". Retrieved 6 June 2005.
- Reynolds, Nicholas E. (1 May 2005). Basrah, Baghdad, and Beyond: U.S. Marine Corps in the Second Iraq War. Naval Institute Press. ISBN 978-1-59114-717-6.
- Ricks, Thomas E. (2006). Fiasco: The American Military Adventure in Iraq. Penguin. ISBN 978-1-59420-103-5.
- Woods, Kevin M (2006). Iraqi Perspectives Project: A View of Operation Iraqi Freedom from Saddam's Senior Leadership (PDF). United States Joint Forces Command, Joint Center for Operational Analysis. ISBN 978-0-9762550-1-7.
- Wright, Steven. The United States and Persian Gulf Security: The Foundations of the War on Terror. Ithaca Press: 2007. ISBN 978-0-86372-321-6.
- Zucchino, David (2004). Thunder Run: The Armored Strike to Capture Baghdad. New York: Atlantic Monthly Press. ISBN 978-0-87113-911-5.
