= Anti-French sentiment =

Hostility towards French people

Anti-French sentiment (Francophobia or Gallophobia) is any manifestation of hatred, prejudice, and discrimination against the French people or the Francophonie. It is most generally based upon a disdain for French culture or the French language, and has been recorded across several countries and regions for centuries. The phenomenon may be motivated by a variety of factors, such as broader feelings of xenophobia or due to certain political developments involving France. Historically, French rivalries with the British and the Germans, among others, largely shaped anti-French sentiment in Europe. The Age of Discovery enabled the spread of this sentiment to varying degrees in the colonized Americas, particularly in British colonies that developed in direct competition with French colonies. Today, political and cultural anti-French sentiment is prominent in many African countries that were colonized by France, as well as in some parts of Anglophone Canada.

== By region ==
=== Europe ===
==== United Kingdom ====
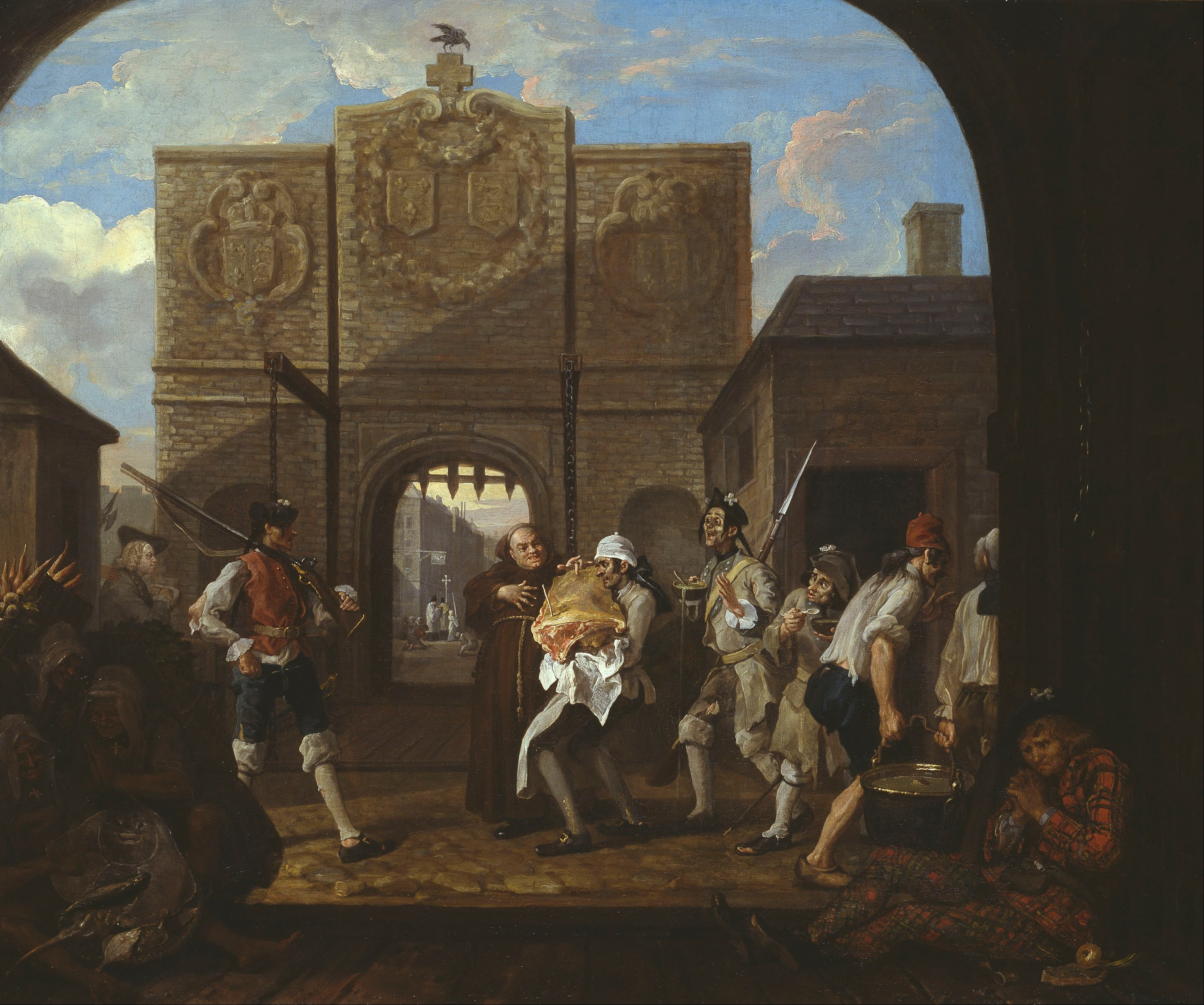
The Gate of Calais: O! The Roast Beef of Old England by William Hogarth portrays France as an oppressive, poverty-stricken and backward culture.

England and France have a long history of conflict, dating from before the Battle of Hastings, when William the Conqueror claimed the English throne. Before becoming King of England, William found conflict with his liege Henry I of France several times and conquered some neighbouring fiefs. The relationship between the countries continued to be filled with conflict, even during the Third Crusade. The medieval era of conflict climaxed during the Hundred Years' War, when the House of Plantagenet fought unsuccessfully for control of the French throne and lost almost all French holdings, which resulted in future English kings being more culturally English from Henry III onwards. Previously, they had largely spoken French and lived in French castles much of the time. Richard the Lionheart, who was famous for his feud with French King Philip, spent most of his life in France and as little as six months of his reign as King in England.

In contrast, relations between Scotland and France were generally good. The French throne sided numerous time with Scotland in its conflicts with the English throne, making this relationship compound the existing direct hostility. The Auld Alliance treaty of 1295 provided for mutual support between Scotland and France in the event of an English attack on either. This was replaced by the 1560 Treaty of Edinburgh between England, Scotland and France.

The modern history of conflict between Britain and France stems from the rise of Britain as a primary commercial and maritime power in Europe in the early 18th century onward and the threat it posed to France's ambitions. Hostility toward and strategic conflict with France's similar interests became a defining characteristic of relations between the two powers. The time between the Glorious Revolution of 1688 and Napoleon's final capitulation in 1815 has been perceived in Britain as a prolonged Franco-British conflict to determine who would be the dominant colonial power (sometimes called the Second Hundred Years' War). British hostility to the Catholic Church, which dated back to earlier conflicts with Catholic Habsburg Spain, contributed to attitudes towards the French because France was also seen as a Catholic power, and the majority of the British people were Protestants. England and later Britain joined continental European states in resisting the rising French imperialism during the reign of Louis XIV and the Napoleonic Wars. Britain also resented France's intervention in the American Revolutionary War. This historical antagonism became ingrained in the culture of both countries but was mostly overcome by their successful alliance to stop German aggression in World War I and World War II in the first half of the 20th century.

The dimensions of the conflict in Britain were as much cultural as strategic. Indeed, British nationalism, in its nascent phases, was in large part an anti-France phenomenon and the attitudes involved extended well beyond who won what on various battlefields:

- France was the most powerful Catholic state for much of the modern period and anti-Catholic sentiments had been widespread in Britain since the Act of Supremacy in 1534.
- The permeation of anti-French sentiment throughout society, as epitomised by the apocryphal story of the Hartlepool monkey hangers, whose belief that the French were literally inhuman led them to have allegedly executed a pet monkey in the belief that it was an invading Frenchman, but the story is based upon the disputed premise that those involved had never seen a Frenchman before.

Robert Graves wrote shortly after the First World War during his time at Oxford University as an undergraduate that:

The eighteenth century owed its unpopularity largely to its Frenchness. Anti-French feeling among most ex-soldiers amounted almost to an obsession. Edmund, shaking with nerves, used to say at this time: "No more wars for me at any price! Except against the French. If ever there is a war against them, I'll go like a shot." Pro-German feeling had been increasing. With the war over and the German armies beaten, we could give the German soldier credit for being the most efficient fighting man in Europe ... Some undergraduates even insisted that we had been fighting on the wrong side: our natural enemies were the French.

— Robert Graves, Goodbye to All That.

==== Germany ====
Beginning with the French invasions of Germany in the late 18th century, France became the century-long rival of Germany. The rising German nationalist movement also considered France their greatest enemy because France not only had temporarily conquered much of Western Germany during the Napoleonic Wars but also was the country most strongly opposed to the idea of a unified German empire and wanted Germany to remain divided into many individual states.

In this time, the myth of the so-called hereditary enmity (German: Erbfeindschaft) came into being, according to which the Romanic French and the Germanic Germans had been antithetic enemies ever since the Battle of the Teutoburg Forest, a notion that was inherently unhistorical. In the 19th century, anti-French sentiment became commonplace in German political discourse even if the deep cultural interrelation between the two could never be blanked out completely. (Johann Wolfgang von Goethe poked fun at this in his epic Faust I with the verse: Ein echter deutscher Mann mag keinen Franzen leiden, doch ihre Weine trinkt er gern. "A real German man likes no Frenchy, but he likes to drink their wines.")

Several German nationalist anthems were written against the French, most prominently Die Wacht am Rhein. After the German victory in the Franco-Prussian War in 1871, the anniversary of the decisive Battle of Sedan was made a semiofficial national holiday in the German Empire.

After the culminations of Franco-German enmity in both world wars, the two actively gave up their mutual animosities in the second half of the twentieth century. The most prominent symbol of this development is the picture of heads of government François Mitterrand and Helmut Kohl holding each other's hands at a ceremony at the military cemetery in Verdun in 1984. Today, Germany and France are close political partners and two closely connected nations. A joint Franco-German television network, Arte, was founded in 1992.

==== Ireland ====
In the 21st century, there have been a few instances of friction between France and the Republic of Ireland over political and economic issues that led to expressions of Irish francophobia. One of these was when Ireland rejected the Lisbon treaty in a referendum in 2008 and Nicolas Sarkozy commented that Ireland "must vote again" – as it indeed did the following year. Another source has been the French criticism of Ireland's low corporate taxation rate and the perceived French resistance to conceding an interest rate reduction on the International Monetary Fund/European Union loan arrangement until Ireland "moves" on this rate, which was perceived as interference.

Francophobia in Ireland rose in the aftermath of a controversial FIFA World Cup playoff game in 2009, leading to protests outside the French Embassy in Dublin. Irish businesses exploited the occasion in a mostly light-hearted way, with promotions offering discounts for every goal scored against France and special reductions to celebrate the elimination of France from the tournament.

==== Russia ====
Some Russians mock French people with the nickname "Lyagushatniki", literally "frog people".

==== Italy ====
On Easter Monday (30 March) 1282, at the Church of the Holy Spirit just outside Palermo, at evening prayer (vespers), a Frenchman harassed a Sicilian woman. This single event led to the massacre of 4,000 Frenchmen over the course of the next six weeks, and the government of the French-born king Charles I of Anjou lost control of the island.

==== Spain ====
El tres de mayo de 1808 en Madrid

Goya painted several famous pictures depicting the violence of the Peninsula wars during the Napoleonic Era. In particular, the French actions against Spanish civilians during the Peninsular War drew a large amount of criticism, as illustrated by The Third of May 1808 painting.

From 5 to 6 June 1808 Spanish clergyman Baltasar Calvo organized a massacre of 400 French civilians in Valencia.

=== Africa ===
French colonialism in Africa led to anti-French sentiments among colonised peoples, particular during periods of conflict between the French and various African states. Imperial disputes with other European colonial powers in Africa (such as the Fashoda Incident) also led to anti-French sentiments. More recently, the French policy of maintaining the Françafrique has been characterized as neocolonialism and led to further anti-French sentiments. France is also accused of privileging its interests, by denying the interests of African states.

Despite promises of French presidents and politicians to normalize relations with African countries and review the policy of the Elysée Palace towards Africa, Paris currently continues to use economic aid and the French language as leverage. However, the African continent has become much more independent in recent decades. Nowadays almost all attempts of the French government to influence African countries end up with discontent and growth of anti-French sentiment.

==== Algeria ====
The Algerian War had been underway since 1954. The Évian Accords of March 18, 1962, brought an end to the conflict. The Accords, which were reached during a cease-fire between French armed forces and the Algerian nationalist organization the FLN, began the process of transfer of power from the French to the Algerians. The Évian Accords intended to guarantee the rights and safety of the Pieds-Noirs, the French-speaking European settlers in an independent Algeria.

In 1959, the Pieds-Noirs numbered 1,025,000, and accounted for 10.4% of the total population of French Algeria. However, rumors had already spread among the Pieds-Noirs that their choice would be between "the suitcase or the coffin". On the morning of July 5, 1962, the day Algeria became independent, seven companies of FLN troops entered the city of Oran when several European settlers fired shots at them. An outraged Arab mob swept into the Pieds-Noir neighborhoods, which had already been largely vacated, and attacked the estimated 40,000 remaining Pieds-Noirs. The violence lasted several hours, during which the mob cut the throats of many men, women and children.

The number of Pieds-Noirs who fled Algeria totalled more than 800,000 between 1962 and 1964.

==== Côte d'Ivoire ====
France's intervention in the civil war in Côte d'Ivoire has triggered anti-French violence by the "Young Patriots" and other groups.

==== Other African countries ====
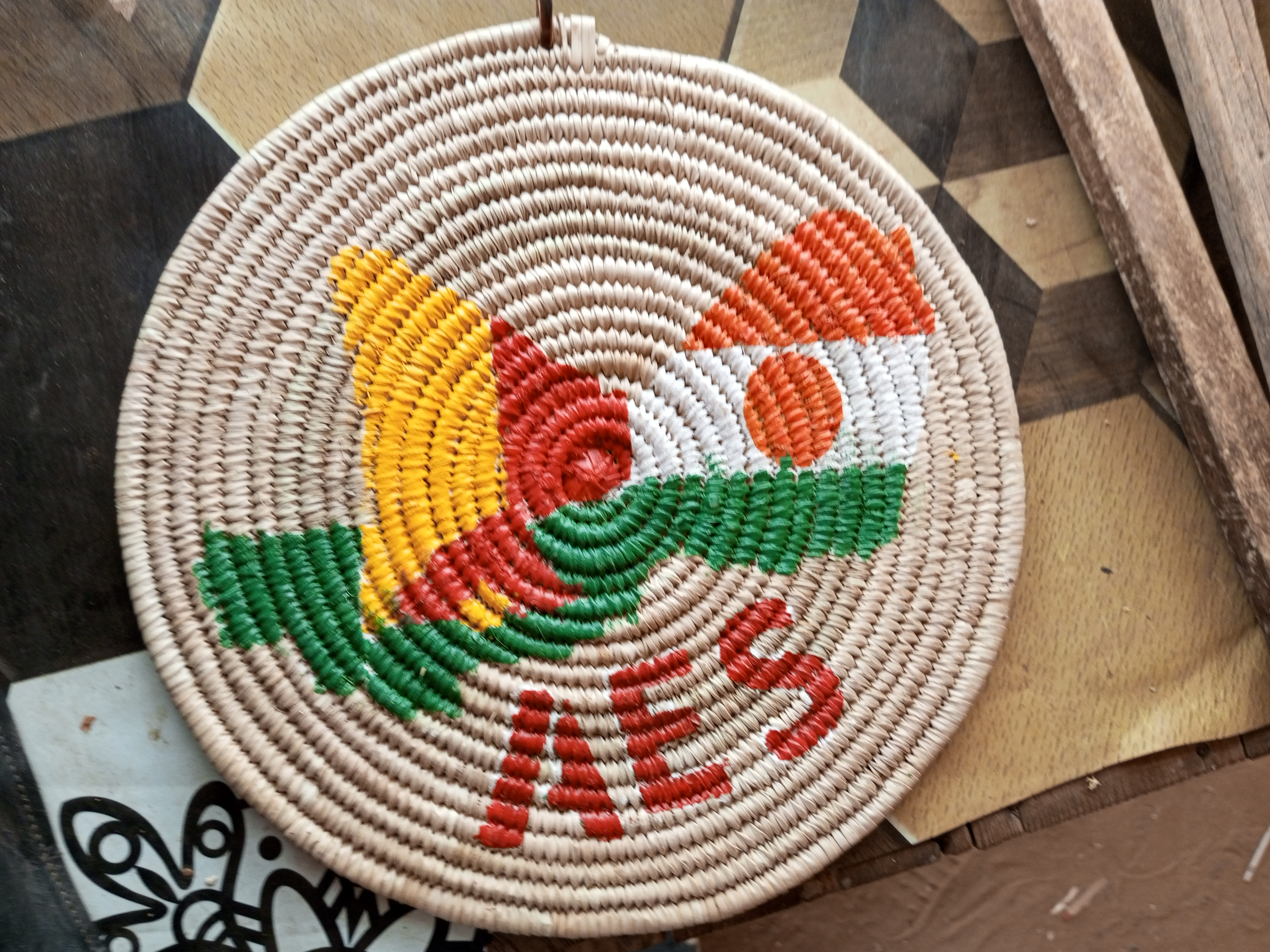
The Alliance of Sahel States is anti-French in outlook.

The new trend of African countries to "turn away" from Paris was provoked by inability of France to maintain stability and security in the former colonies. Coups and attempted coups indicate the growth of anti-French sentiment and the collapse of Francafrique. Moreover, the countries of Mali and Burkina Faso removed French as an official language due to deteriorating relations with France's government. Over the past years, rebellions have occurred not only in Mali, Burkina-Faso and Niger, but also in Chad and Gabon, forcing France to reduce its presence on the continent. Thus, Paris reduces the number of its military personnel from 350 to 100 in Gabon, and from 1000 to 300 in Chad.

On 6 July 2024, Mali, Niger and Burkina Faso also formed the Alliance of Sahel States, a confederation which is anti-French (as well as anti-ECOWAS) in outlook.

=== Asia ===
==== Azerbaijan ====
As the result of France's closeness toward Armenia during the 2020 Nagorno-Karabakh conflict, anti-French sentiment began to develop in Azerbaijan, where Azerbaijan accused France of being one-sided and Turkophobic. In addition, reporters from France have also faced numerous instances of harassment and hostility from the host nation. In November 2020, Azerbaijan sent a protest note to Paris after the French Senate recognized the Republic of Artsakh. As it is only a motion, it is not legally binding.

==== Vietnam ====
French colonists were given the special epithet thực dân (originally meaning colonist but evolving to refer to the oppressive regime of the French) in Vietnamese; it is still universally used in discussions about the colonial era. After the French were pushed out of Vietnam, those who collaborated with them (called tay sai – agents) were vilified. Those who left for France with the French were known as Việt gian (Viet traitors) and had all their property confiscated.

==== Cambodia ====
During the First Indochina War, many members of the Cambodian government joined the anti - French Khmer Issarak. After Cambodia's independence in 1953, Head of State Norodom Sihanouk refused to make French an official language in his country. During the Khmer Republic of Lon Nol, Cambodia had a fond relationship with their former colonizer. It was after Sihanouk - Pol Pot forces launched an offensive and overthrew Lon Nol, that Pol Pot and the Khmer Rouge passed anti - French laws that punished people who had any knowledge of the language at all. French in Cambodia would decline until the restoration of the monarchy in 1993. As a result of the Khmer Rouge's policies, Cambodia is the country in the former French Indochina with the least number of speakers learning French, as English has become more of a second language.

==== China ====
During the 1884 Battle of Tamsui, the Chinese took prisoner and beheaded 11 French marines, who were injured, in addition to La Gailissonniere's captain Fontaine and used bamboo poles to display the heads in public to incite anti-French feelings in China. Pictures of the decapitation of the French were published in the Tien-shih-tsai Pictorial Journal in Shanghai. There was an anti-French campaign in 1916–1917.

==== Syria ====
Anti-French sentiment started to develop when the French, who negotiated the 1916 Sykes–Picot Agreement, began invading Syria. The Battle of Maysalun that happened in 1920, where the Syrian Army was under the command of the charismatic Yusuf al-'Azma, symbolized a strong anti-French sentiment among Syrians as France had regenerated the promise to occupy and terrorize the Syrian population. French rule in Syria was resented by many Syrians, and French involvement in the Syrian Civil War (2011-2024) also gained little sympathy.

==== Pakistan ====
In October 2020, there were numerous protests in Pakistan concerning President Macron's statements on the murder of Samuel Paty.

In April 2021, violent anti-French protests organised by the Tehreek-e-Labbaik led the French embassy to advise all French citizens in Pakistan to leave the country.

==== Turkey ====
In October 2020, Turkish President Recep Tayyip Erdoğan called for Turkish citizens to boycott French products.

=== Americas ===
==== United States ====
Despite a large French contribution to the 1991 Iraq Gulf War (called Operation Daguet) and the French presence in Afghanistan (Operation Enduring Freedom), the opposition of French President Jacques Chirac to the 2003 Iraq War led to a significant rise in anti-French sentiment in the United States. In March 2003, the cafeteria of the United States House of Representatives had its French fries and French toast renamed to freedom fries and toast, at the direction of Representatives Bob Ney and Walter Jones. Ney chaired the Committee on House Administration and had authority over the menu in the House cafeteria.

The french fries renaming was not without controversy or opposition. Timothy Noah of Slate noted that the move was "meant to demonize France for its exasperating refusal to support a war against Iraq". He compared the 2003 renamings to the renaming of all things German in World War I, but argued that the freedom fries episode was even worse because "Germany, after all, was America's enemy, whereas France is America's NATO ally."

The swell of anti-French sentiment in the United States resulting from 2003 episode was marked. Various media personalities and politicians openly expressed anti-French sentiments; News Corporation's media outlets, particularly the Fox Entertainment Group's Fox News Network, were specifically implicated in a campaign fanning francophobia at the time of the war. By 2006, anti-French sentiment among the American public began to decline, following an increased rise in opposition to the Iraq War and rising disapproval of the George W. Bush administration. As a result, positive views of France among Americans began to increase steadily and by 2016, American favorable ratings of France reached a historic high of 87%.

Historically, the French-speaking peoples of Louisiana and New England have also been exposed to disparagement and discrimination. Along with nationwide suppression of the French language, francophones in Vermont were subject to involuntary sterilization during the early twentieth century, when Vermont implemented eugenics policies targeting "the poor, the disabled, French-Canadians and Native Americans." In the 1960s, a common argument against the founding of CODOFIL, Louisiana's agency of francophone affairs, was that empowering the francophone population might foster Quebec-style nationalism, and fracturing national unity. US Representative James R. Domengeaux and founder of CODOFIL and a prominent advocate for francophone rights, was forced to address these concerns on multiple occasions. While subsequent years have since proven these fears baseless, such arguments were considered an adequate reason to deny Louisiana's francophones basic political recognition.

==== Canada ====
Anti-Quebec sentiment (French: Sentiment anti-Québécois) is a form of prejudice which is expressed toward the government, culture, and/or the francophone people of Quebec.

The French-language media in Quebec has termed anti-Quebec sentiment Québec bashing—what it perceives as hateful, anti-Quebec coverage in the English-language media. It mostly cites examples from the English-Canadian media, and occasionally in coverage from other countries, often based on Canadian sources. Some sovereignist journalists and academics noted that unfavourable depictions of the province by the media increased in the late 1990s after the unsuccessful 1995 Quebec referendum on independence.

==== Haiti ====
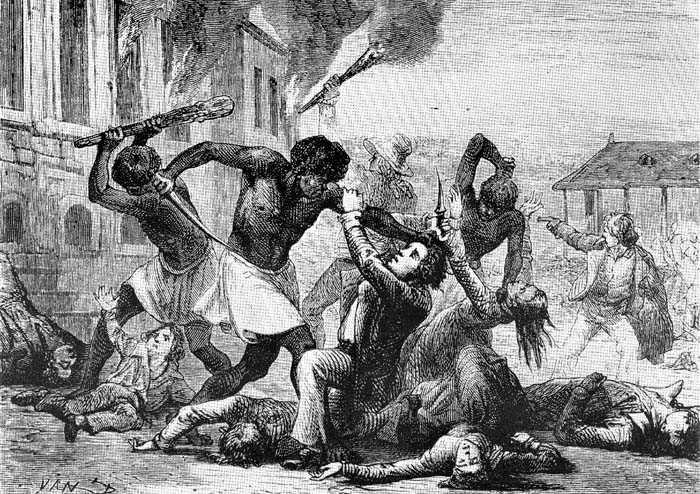
1804 Haiti massacre

In 1804, Haitian leader Jean-Jacques Dessalines ordered the massacre of nearly all white men, women, and children remaining in Haiti following the Haitian Revolution "except for priests, skilled artisans, health care workers, Americans and British"; between January and April 1804, 3,000 to 5,000 whites were killed.

=== Oceania ===
==== New Zealand ====
France controls several islands in the Pacific Ocean which include New Caledonia, Wallis and Futuna Islands and French Polynesia. There have been sporadic independence demonstrations in French Polynesia, and briefly in the 1980s, a pro-independence insurgency in New Caledonia, led by the Front de Libération Nationale Kanak Socialiste.

There is also the issue of nuclear testing in the Pacific. Since 1960, around 200 nuclear tests have occurred around the Pacific, to the opprobrium of other Pacific states, Australia and New Zealand. In 1972, the Greenpeace vessel Vega was rammed at Moruroa. The following year Greenpeace protesters were detained by the French, and the skipper claimed he was beaten. Also, in 1985 the French secret service bombed and sank the Greenpeace ship Rainbow Warrior in Auckland, New Zealand. Greenpeace had been a very vocal opponent of French nuclear testing in the Pacific. In 1982, New Zealand reggae band Herbs released their breakthrough single, "French Letter", which strongly criticised French nuclear testing. The end of the Cold War led to a French moratorium on nuclear testing, but it was lifted in 1995 by Jacques Chirac. French security forces had sought to interfere with the activity of nuclear testing protesters. Australia ceased military cooperation with France and embargoed the export of uranium to France. Chirac's decision to run a nuclear test series at Mururoa on 5 September and 2 October 1995, just one year before the Comprehensive Test Ban Treaty was to be signed, caused worldwide protest, including an embargo of French wine. Riots took place across Polynesia, and the South Pacific Forum threatened to suspend France.

==== Australia ====
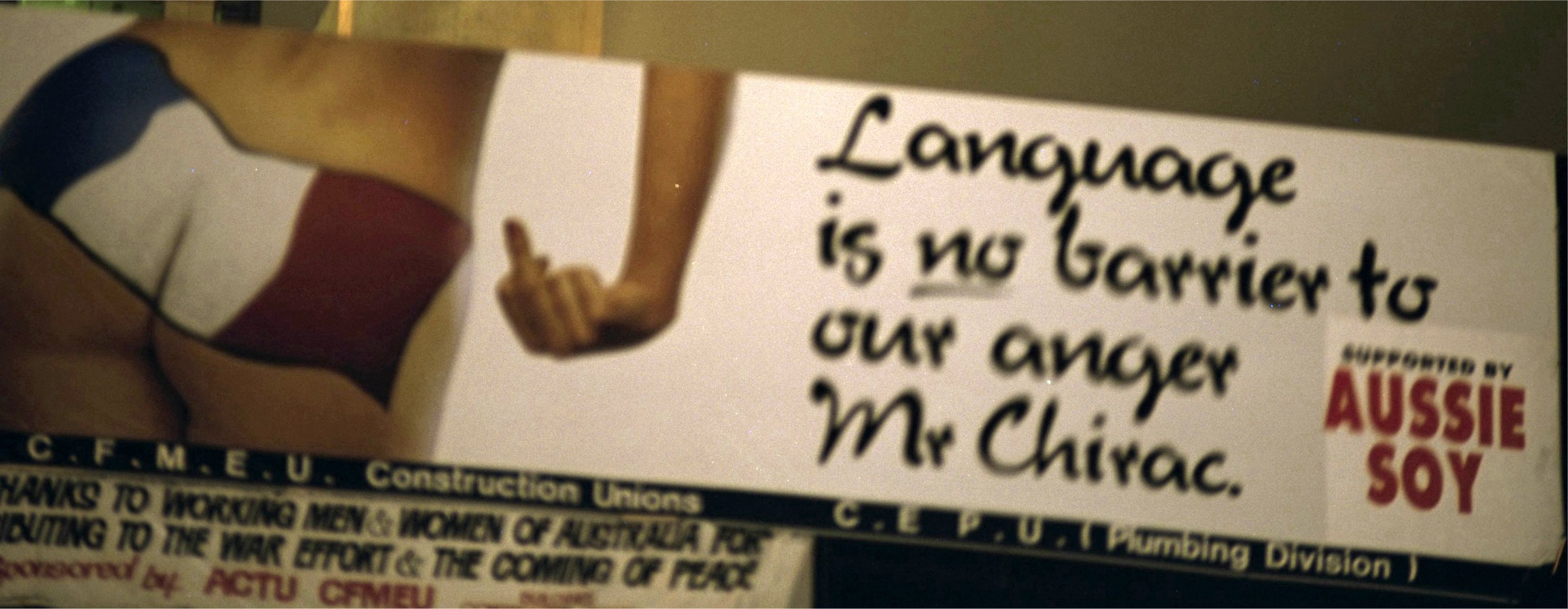
Protests in Australia against French nuclear tests in Pacific, 1996.

Similar anti-French protests occurred in Australia in response to Jacques Chirac's announcement of his intentions to resume French nuclear tests in the Pacific in 1995. In Sydney, protestors marched with placards stating "Guillotine Chirac", "In Your Back Yard Jacques" and "Ageing Hippies Against the Bomb". According to British journalists Robert Milliken and Tony Barber, French nuclear tests in the Pacific had led Australia (and New Zealand) to " [drift] further from their European roots" and reorient their foreign policy in Asia, and establish closer relationships with nations in the Pacific. Numerous boycotts were launched against French companies and products in Australia, and French-owned businesses were vandalised. Marc Lacher, a French-born Australian with dual citizenship, noted that "Like many French people in Australia we're against the tests." Lacher also stated that "If Australia is serious, it would stop selling uranium to France".

==== New Caledonia ====
New Caledonia is a sui generis collectivity of overseas France in the southwest Pacific Ocean. The separatist Kanak Socialist National Liberation Front has been operating on the island since the 1970s. They demand independence from France. In May 2024, the organization's activities intensified due to attempt of Paris to amend the constitution which would allow migrants who arrived on the island after 1998 to participate in elections and referendums. French President Emmanuel Macron had to declare a state of emergency in New Caledonia and send troops to counter the protesters. At the moment, France has arrested 11 rebels and taken them to its territory by a special board. This event caused a wave of riots. The protesters are smashing up administrative buildings and gun shops.

== France and World War II ==
The Second World War had an effect on the modern French image abroad. Before the war's outbreak, the French government had reluctantly acquiesced to British Prime Minister Neville Chamberlain's policy of appeasement and acceptance of Adolf Hitler's various violations of the Versailles Treaty and his demands at Munich in 1938. French Prime Minister Édouard Daladier was under no illusions about Hitler's ultimate goals and initially opposed Chamberlain's policy and told the British in a late April 1938 meeting that Hitler's real aim was to eventually secure "a domination of the Continent in comparison with which the ambitions of Napoleon were feeble.... Today it is the turn of Czechoslovakia. Tomorrow it will be the turn of Poland and Romania". However, in the end, Daladier could not stand without Chamberlain's support and let him have his way with the appeasement of Hitler at the Munich Agreement.

The prime ministers of France between the World Wars were generally frightened about German intentions, as France sustained more casualties in the First World War than any other Western country, approximately 1.4 million military and 1.6 million total casualties. Accordingly, French policies towards Germany, more specifically the Nazis, were more aggressive than that of other Western nations. Relations were very poor at the time, and French leaders were also acutely aware that the population of Germany (64 million) exceeded that of France by a considerable margin (40 million), a major strategic vulnerability.

The vulnerability and France's proximity to Germany caused French leaders to take a harder stance on Germany than the British. The French occupation of the Rhineland and France's desire to collect reparations, owed by Germany under the Versailles treaty to France, caused British leaders to see French leaders as pushing for war with Germany.

The predecessor of Daladier, Léon Blum, was acutely aware of the dangers Germany could pose. He even considered military assistance to the Spanish government during the Spanish Civil War (the Germans were supporting the Nationalists) but reluctantly decided otherwise, as some Nationalist sympathizers in France openly threatened civil war, just like in Spain. Also, the predecessor of Chamberlain, Stanley Baldwin, and his staff, including Anthony Eden, strongly opposed any aid for fear both of communism (the Soviet Union was supporting the Republicans) and of the war escalating into another world war.

In 1940, the military defeat of the French Army, after only a month, caused much disillusion across Europe. As a consequence, the image and the reputation of France as Europe's military superpower were seriously compromised, even after the war ended. Vichy France collaborated with Germany, which included anti-Jewish legislation and other actions, which had a negative effect on the French image abroad. However, Free French Forces still participated actively in the final Allied victory, and France rebuilt its military after the war to recover some of its position as a major military power.

== France as a major power ==
Results of 2017 BBC World Service poll Views of France's influence by country (sorted by net positive, Pos – Neg)
Country polled	Pos.	Neg.	Neutral	Pos – Neg
Turkey	38%	43%	19%	-5
Pakistan	25%	26%	49%	-1
Indonesia	31%	26%	43%	+5
Russia	35%	22%	43%	+13
India	37%	20%	43%	+17
Spain	44%	26%	30%	+18
Peru	47%	25%	28%	+22
Nigeria	55%	24%	21%	+31
Mexico	56%	24%	20%	+32
Kenya	53%	21%	26%	+32
United Kingdom	66%	29%	5%	+37
Greece	50%	11%	39%	+39
Brazil	59%	19%	22%	+40
Australia	69%	23%	8%	+46
United States	66%	19%	15%	+47
Germany	56%	6%	38%	+50
China	74%	16%	10%	+58
Canada	74%	14%	12%	+60

Post-World War II France is a major world power with nuclear armed forces retaining a weapons stockpile of around 300 operational nuclear warheads, making it the third-largest in the world. France also has a permanent seat at the United Nations Security Council, and one of the largest economies in the world. It is very active in international affairs in locations overseas (such as its continuing participation in Libya, its Pacific nuclear testing in the 1980s, and in interventions in its former African colonies).

However, France's status and active foreign policy have caused it to attract some negative attention. Some view some of postwar France's leaders to be vocal and independent-minded in their dealings with other major nations. The two French presidents most often perceived to be vocal and independent are Charles de Gaulle and Jacques Chirac.

=== De Gaulle's presidencies and Gaullism in the 1960s ===
The policies of Charles de Gaulle during his second presidency (1959–1969) included several actions that some critics have held against him.

- De Gaulle advocated the view that while France remained within the political structure of NATO, it should partially act as a third pole between the United States and the Soviet Union, actively supporting European organizations such as the European Economic Community, and maintaining close ties with other western European nations (especially with West Germany). This viewpoint was not unique to De Gaulle or the French, because many other nations sought varying degrees of non-aligned status with reference to the two major blocs (the United States/NATO and the Soviet bloc). India, China, Indonesia, and many other nations formed the Non-Aligned Movement, and Yugoslavia pursued a largely independent course from Moscow from 1948 until its dissolution in 2003.
- De Gaulle decided to end the presence of NATO bases on French soil, and he withdrew France from the military structure of NATO. However, France remained within NATO's political structure.
- De Gaulle opposed the UK's application to join the EEC in 1963 and 1967. However, the next French President, Georges Pompidou. reversed De Gaulle's position and supported the UK's admission to the EEC in 1973. Since De Gaulle, French presidents have generally pursued closer relations with British leaders, including Jacques Chirac, who worked with Tony Blair even during the Iraq War.
- While he was visiting Montreal, Quebec, Canada in order to attend the World's Fair in 1967, De Gaulle expressed his sympathy for the Quebec sovereignty movement, with the "Vive le Québec libre!" speech. This speech was highly regarded by supporters of the Quebec independence movement. However, it was widely criticized by French citizens, the French press, and some French-Canadians, including the future-Canadian prime minister, Pierre Trudeau, a French-Canadian from Montreal.

In short, De Gaulle advocated for a strong French presence among the great nations and of France's independence from both the United States and the Soviet Union.

== See also ==
- 112 Gripes about the French
- Racism
- Anglophobia
- Anti-French sentiment in the United States
- Anti-Canadian sentiment
- Anti-Quebec sentiment
- Cheese-eating surrender monkeys
- Coup Belt
- Foreign relations of France
- Françafrique
- Franco-American relations
- Freedom fries
- Germanophobia
- Pardon my French
- "Speak White"
- Sweden-bashing
- Xenophobia
