= Cheese-eating surrender monkeys =

Pejorative term for French people

"Cheese-eating surrender monkeys", sometimes shortened to "surrender monkeys", is a pejorative term for French people. The term was coined in 1995 by Ken Keeler, a writer for the television series The Simpsons, and has entered two Oxford quotation dictionaries.

== Origin ==
The term "cheese-eating surrender monkeys" first appeared in "'Round Springfield", an April 1995 episode of The Simpsons, an American animated television show. In the episode, budget cuts at Springfield Elementary School force the school's Scottish janitor, Groundskeeper Willie, to teach French. Expressing his disdain for French people, he says in a heavy Scottish burr to the class: "Bonjourrrrrrrrr, you cheese-eating surrender monkeys!"

On the episode's audio commentary, executive producer Al Jean said the line was probably written by The Simpsons staff writer Ken Keeler. In a February 2012 interview, Keeler confirmed that he coined the term; he said he considers it his best contribution to the show. Al Jean commented that the staff did not expect the term to become widely used and never intended it as any kind of genuine political statement.

When "'Round Springfield" was dubbed for a French audience, the line became "Rendez vous, singes mangeurs de fromage" ("Surrender, cheese-eating monkeys").

== Later use and impact ==
In 2005 Ned Sherrin selected the term for inclusion in the third edition of the Oxford Dictionary of Humorous Quotations. It is also included in the 2007 Oxford Dictionary of Modern Quotations.

=== Political ===
The term gained political traction in the US, especially in right-wing circles, when Jonah Goldberg, a columnist for the National Review magazine, used it in the title of an April 1999 column on the "Top Ten Reasons to Hate the French". In the run up to and during the Iraq War, Goldberg reprised it to criticize European nations and France in particular for not joining the Coalition of the Willing, the United States-led invasion and occupation of Iraq.

In 2005, Nigel Farage used the phrase in a debate with Tony Blair over the United Kingdom's financial contributions to the European Union, in which Farage contrasted Blair with Jacques Chirac, whom Farage praised for standing up for the French people, while accusing Blair of failing to do the same for the British people.

Ben Macintyre of The Times wrote in August 2007 that it is "perhaps the most famous" of the coinages from The Simpsons and it "has gone on to become a journalistic cliché". The New York Post used it (as "Surrender Monkeys") as the headline for its December 7, 2006, front page, referring to the Iraq Study Group, and its recommendation that American soldiers be withdrawn from Iraq by January 2008.

The Daily Telegraph (November 2010) cited it in relation to Anglo-French military cooperation. In August 2013, The Independent suggested an evolution away from the term, in a headline about French-American relations over the Syrian Civil War.

On 6 March 2014, opposition Leader Bill Shorten used the term in the Australian Parliament. He called the Government of Australia "the cheese-eating surrender monkeys of Australian jobs". When asked to withdraw the comment, Shorten claimed he borrowed the line from an American politician, whom he could not name. On 28 July 2014, Australia's Immigration Minister Scott Morrison used it to describe the Labor and Greens position on asylum seekers.

=== Other notable uses ===
Anthony Bourdain described fellow chef Patrick Clark in his book Kitchen Confidential (2000) as follows: "He was kind of famous; he was big and black; most important, he was an American, one of us, not some cheese-eating, surrender specialist Froggie."

Jeremy Clarkson used it on Top Gear in June 2003 to describe the handling of the Renault Clio V6 and in a 4 June 2006 episode to describe the manufacturers of the Citroën C6. In Series 13, Episode 5, he calls the other French drivers "cheese-eating sideways monkeys" as they were overtaking him while sliding sideways.

In October 2025, a director at the Scottish quango Historic Environment Scotland was publicly criticised for using the term to refer to French people.

== See also ==
- 112 Gripes about the French
- Anti-French sentiment in the United States
- Axis of weasels
- Francophobia
- Freedom fries
