= 112 Gripes About the French =

1945 handbook issued by the United States military

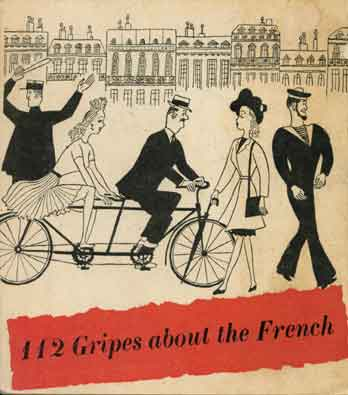
- Author: Leo Rosten
- Original title: 112 Gripes about the French
- Published: 1945
- Publisher: Information & Education Division of the US Occupation Forces
- Publication place: France
- Pages: 120
- ISBN: 1-4191-6512-7

112 Gripes About the French was a 1945 handbook issued by the United States military authorities to enlisted personnel arriving in France after the Liberation. It was meant to defuse the growing tension between the American military and the locals.

== History ==
The euphoria of victory over Germany was short-lived, and within months of Liberation, tensions began to rise between the French and the U.S. military personnel stationed in the country, with the former seeing the latter as arrogant and wanting to flaunt their wealth, and the latter seeing the former as proud and resentful. Fights were breaking out more often, and fears were raised, even among high officials, that the situation might eventually lead to a breakdown of civil order.

The War Department commissioned humorist Leo Rosten to address the matter. He and the co-authors set out in a witty yet trenchant question-and-answer format, 112 Gripes about the French posed a series of well-rehearsed complaints about the French, and then provided a common-sense rejoinder to each of them –the aim being to explain the culture clash, provide context, and defuse tensions between the average soldier and his hosts. Subjects ranged from geopolitics to prostitution and from hygiene to plumbing.

It has been republished in the United States in 2004 (ISBN 1-4191-6512-7), and in France under the title "Nos amis les Français" ("Our friends the French"), ISBN 2-7491-0128-X in 2003, where it became a best-seller.

== Contents ==
The French and Us

The French

Characteristics

Customs and Manners

Cleanliness and Sanitation

Work and Laziness

Moral

Automobiles and Locomotives

The French and the Germans

Prices: “We're being gypped”

The Black Market

Those French Soldiers

French Collaboration

“They got off pretty easy in this war”

French Politics

== See also ==
- Anti-French sentiment in the United States
- Franco-American relations
- Francophobia
- Military history of France during World War II
- Military of the United States
- Cheese-eating surrender monkeys

== Sources ==
- 112 Gripes about the French (PDF). Archived from the original (PDF) on 2015-10-17.
- BBC comments on the recent republishing of the handbook.
