= Minutemen (disambiguation) =

Minutemen were civilian militia units during the American Revolutionary War.

Minutemen, Minute Men, or Minuteman may also refer to:

== Political and military groups ==
- Culpeper Minutemen, a militia formed in Virginia, US in 1775
- Minuteman Civil Defense Corps, a group dedicated to preventing illegal crossings of the U.S. border, founded in the 2000s
- Minuteman Project, an organization that monitors illegal immigrants on the United States–Mexico borders, founded in 2004
- Minutemen (anti-Communist organization), headed by Robert DePugh, founded in the early 1960s
- Minutemen (Missouri Secessionist Paramilitaries), a pro-secession paramilitary organization active in St. Louis, Missouri, US from Jan-May 1861
- The New Jersey Minutemen, a militant anti-fascist group that operated in Newark, New Jersey, from 1933 to 1941.
- VR-55 Minutemen, a US Navy Reserve C-130 squadron

== Arts, entertainment, and media ==
=== Art and music ===
- The Minute Man (1874), a sculpture by Daniel Chester French in Concord, Massachusetts, US
- The Lexington Minuteman (1900), a sculpture by Henry Hudson Kitson, located in Lexington, Massachusetts, US
- Minutemen (band), a 1980s punk rock band

=== Comics ===
- Minutemen (Watchmen), a team of comic book characters found in Alan Moore's Watchmen
- Minutemen (Marvel Comics), agents of the Time Variance Authority
- Minute-Man, a comic book superhero appearing in Fawcett Comics and DC Comics
- The Minutemen (100 Bullets), fictional characters in the 100 Bullets comic series
- Before Watchmen: Minutemen, a comic book series by Darwyn Cooke

=== Fiction ===
- Minutemen (film), a 2008 science-fiction Disney Channel Original Movie
- Minute Men, a paramilitary body in the 1935 Sinclair Lewis novel, It Can't Happen Here
- The Minutemen, a faction in the 2015 video game Fallout 4
- Minutemen, soldiers working for the Time Variance Authority (TVA) in the Disney+ series Loki

== Places ==
- Minute Man National Historical Park, a park commemorating the American Revolution
- Minuteman Bikeway, a paved path/trail in eastern Massachusetts
- Minuteman Career and Technical High School, a vocational high school in Lexington, Massachusetts, US
- Minuteman Library Network, a library network in Massachusetts
- Minuteman Missile National Historic Site, two deactivated Minuteman missile sites

== Sports ==
- Boston Minutemen, a soccer team
- Missouri Minutemen, an indoor football team
- UMass Minutemen and Minutewomen, a nickname for University of Massachusetts Amherst athletes

== Other uses ==
- LGM-30 Minuteman, an American intercontinental ballistic missile (ICBM) weapons system
- Minuteman Salsa, a former brand of American made salsa
