= Minuteman Salsa =

Brand of salsa in the United States

Jar of Minuteman salsa

Minuteman Salsa was a brand of salsa made in the United States. The brand was founded by Ryan Lambert along with four associates during mid-2006 in reference to the illegal immigration debate.

Minuteman Salsa asserted that it was America's only 100% United States-made salsa. The company boasted of its "Americanness" as its main selling point, claiming the salsa was made in America using "American ingredients". The company's now-defunct web site criticized "Big Salsa" for owning factories outside the United States.

Minuteman Salsa and founder Ryan Lambert were awarded a "bum steer" award by the Texas politics and culture magazine Texas Monthly in the January 2007 issue. The salsa and its founder appeared in numerous newspapers, including the Albuquerque Journal and the El Paso Times.

Minuteman Salsa claimed that it donated a portion of its profits to the Minuteman Project, an American vigilante organization that patrols the Mexico–United States border to prevent migrants from successfully crossing into the United States. The salsa's slogan was "Deport Bad Taste."

== See also ==
- Freedom fries
- Star Spangled Ice Cream
