= Star Spangled Ice Cream =

American ice cream company

- Founded: 2003; 23 years ago
- Founders: Richard Lessner; Frank Cannon; Andrew Stein
- Defunct: c. 2009
- Headquarters: Baltimore

Star Spangled Ice Cream was an American ice cream company founded in 2003 by three conservative activists and marketed as a politically conservative alternative to Ben & Jerry's, which the founders considered to be too liberal.

== History ==
In 2003, amid the beginning of the Iraq War, Andrew Stein and his friends decided to create an ice cream brand in support of George W. Bush. They agreed that Ben & Jerry's made good ice cream, but disagreed with the company's liberal politics, so they founded Star Spangled Ice Cream. The founders, Richard Lessner, Frank Cannon, and Andrew Stein, had no knowledge of how to make ice cream, so they contracted production to a company in Baltimore called Moxley's. The company sold ice cream online, and the price of dry ice to keep the product cold put the price at $66 for six pints or $76 for four quarts. The company described the price of $76 as "patriotic", and ten percent of profits went to organizations supporting the United States armed forces, including the Navy League of the United States.

Star Spangled Ice Cream was based in Baltimore, Maryland. The company, like Ben & Jerry's, made use of puns in their ice cream flavor names. Examples included "Fightin' Marine Tough Cookies & Cream", "Iraqi Road", "Smaller GovernMint", "G.I. Love Chocolate", "Navy Battle Chip", "Nutty Environmentalist", and "I Hate the French Vanilla". "I Hate the French Vanilla" was later renamed to "Air Force Plane Vanilla".

Star Spangled Ice Cream gave out samples at the 2004 Conservative Political Action Conference. In 2005, the company began to sell its product in 7-Eleven stores in the mid-Atlantic United States. That same year it began to be sold in stores on some American military bases. The producer of the ice cream, Moxley's, struggled to keep up with the expansion of the business into physical locations. The company was defunct by 2009.

== Reception ==
Reviewers at NBC News described the ice cream as "tooth-achingly sweet", and noted that the base ice cream was good but had a chalky texture. Taste testers assembled by The New York Times described the taste as "undistinguished", and one compared it to "the little cups of ice cream in elementary school, the kind with wooden paddles." The taste of "Smaller GovernMint" was compared to toothpaste and Noxzema shaving cream. The Forward criticized some of the names given to the flavors, including "Iraqi Road" and "I Hate the French Vanilla", as overtly xenophobic.

Musician Ted Nugent endorsed the brand and said that he enjoyed the "Gun Nut" flavor. The company's founders said that Ben & Jerry's viewed them with contempt, although Ben & Jerry's never actually acknowledged the existence of Star Spangled Ice Cream.

== See also ==
- Black Rifle Coffee Company – U.S. coffee company (founded 2014)
- Freedom fries – Politically motivated euphemism for French fries
- Minuteman Salsa – Brand of salsa in the United States
