= CIA activities in France =

While the CIA cooperates with its French counterpart, the DGSE, the countries do collect information on one another, especially in the economic and scientific areas.

== 1937 ==
=== French Connection ===
Illegal heroin labs were first discovered near Marseille, France, in 1937. These labs were run by Corsican gang leader Paul Carbone. For years, the Corsican underworld had been involved in the manufacturing and trafficking of heroin, primarily to the United States. It was this heroin network that eventually became known as "the French Connection". The Corsican Gang was protected by the Central Intelligence Agency (CIA) and the SDECE after World War II in exchange for working to prevent French communists from bringing the Old Port of Marseille under their control.

== 1950 ==
=== Unconventional warfare preparation ===
CIA forms the French branch of Operation Gladio.

The CIA is suspected to have infiltrated the French Communist party and worked to support the growth of non-revolutionary communists within France to offset the Soviet influence on the more radical elements within the French Communist Party.

The CIA is suspected to have been involved in supporting the student riots against Charles DeGaulle to retaliate against his withdrawal from NATO and his Francophile policies.

"Charles De Gaulle undertook covert operations in Quebec using nationalist and separatist movements in Quebec, under the rubric of "Assistance et Cooperation Technique" or "Operation Ascot." Jacques Foccart dispatched SDECE agents to Quebec to develop and foment the growth of separatist movements."

== 1961 ==
Admiral Pierre Lacoste stated that the CIA supported the French Gladio and the OAS right-wing extremist organization to attack Charles de Gaulle.

== 1993 ==
=== Clandestine intelligence collection ===
In 1993, R. James Woolsey, then a new Director of Central Intelligence, publicly announced that economic intelligence focused on European corrupt practices and bribery was now a CIA program. French intelligence had been aggressively going after information from American executives. Woolsey said "No more Mr. Nice Guy."

Shortly afterwards, the CIA Paris station had at least five officers working on understanding French national trade policy, and countering French economic espionage against the US. Four were under diplomatic and one under nonofficial cover.

== 1995 ==
=== Clandestine intelligence collection ===
The CIA Inspector General delivered a report on CIA clandestine service work on economic intelligence, which is likely to end the careers of several officers, including Paris station chief Dick Holm, European CS division chief Joseph DeTrani, and at least four case officers.

France's Interior Minister, Charles Pasqua, revealed the problem in February 1995. The officer under nonofficial cover as a foundation representative made two errors in posing as a foundation representative: communicating too openly with the CIA station and communing too secretly with her target, a French official. Mr. Holm, the station chief, found out about the love affair she was conducting with the official. It was clear that the romance could compromise the operation. Holm convinced his chief to continue the operation.

The French, however, broke the usual agreement among Western services and announced what they had learned, expelling the embassy-based officer "incompatible with their diplomatic status". Controversy flared over questions about whether spying on allies for economic data is a worthy pursuit for the CIA, even if the allies do it to the US, or if other missions have a higher priority. While there were tragicomic aspects, the issue of what espionage is tolerable among nominal allies remains complex, especially when involving clear security issues as with Jonathan Pollard.

== 2006 ==
=== Rendition and clandestine intelligence collection ===
The International Federation for Human Rights (FIDH) and the League of Human Rights (LDH) filed a complaint urging the French Public Prosecutor to investigate the alleged use of French airports by secret CIA flights transporting terrorist suspects.
