= Mitterrand and Kohl holding hands in Verdun =

Symbolic moment of franco-german reconciliation

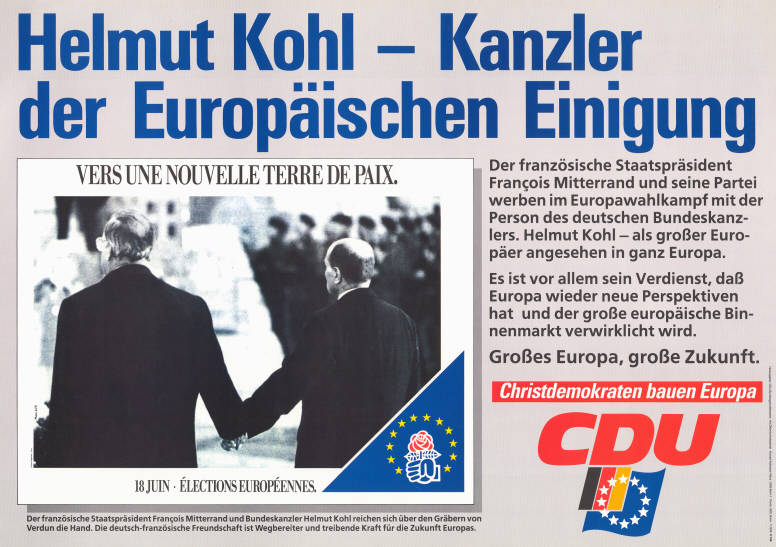
The photo of the handholding on a CDU poster for the 1989 European elections.

French President François Mitterrand and West German Chancellor Helmut Kohl held hands during a 1984 Franco-German ceremony to honour the dead at the Douaumont Ossuary, near Verdun. The gesture became a symbol of the reconciliation of Franco-German relations.

The handholding took place on September 22, 1984, in front of a catafalque placed at the entrance to the Douaumont Ossuary, during a ceremony to honour those killed in World War I and World War II.

Unplanned, the President of the French Republic, François Mitterrand, spontaneously held hands with the Chancellor of the Federal Republic of Germany, Helmut Kohl, as they stood together to listen to the French anthem, immediately after the German anthem had been played.

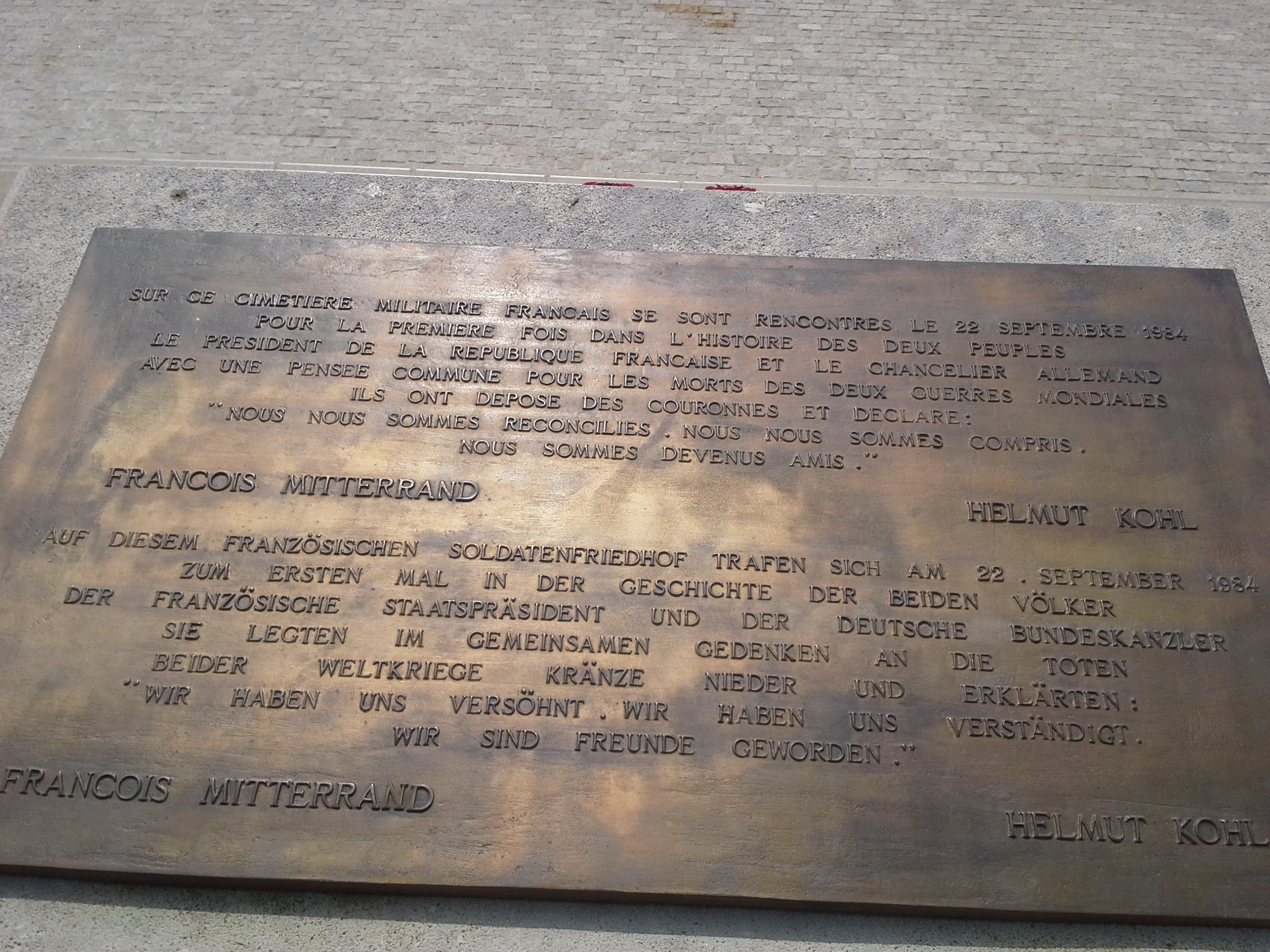
Plaque commemorating this moment installed in front of the Ossuary. The inscription reads: "On September 22, 1984, the President of the French Republic and the German Chancellor met on this French military cemetery for the first time in the history of the two peoples. In memory of the dead of the two world wars they laid wreaths and declared: "We have reconciled. We have come to understand each other. We have become friends." François Mitterrand Helmut Kohl"

== See also ==
- Kniefall von Warschau
