= Anti-French sentiment in the United States =

Anti-French sentiment in the United States has consisted of unfavorable estimations, hatred, dislike, and fear of, and prejudice, discrimination and racism towards, the government, culture, language or people of France by people in the United States of America, sometimes spurred on by media and government leaders.

== 18th century ==
The Patriot victory in the American Revolutionary War, which resulted in the Thirteen Colonies declaring their independence from British rule as the United States, was heavily dependent on French assistance. After the conflict, late 18th-century American politics was contested between the pro-French Democratic-Republican Party and the pro-British Federalist Party, the latter of whom were frequently hostile to France. Leading Federalist politicians, including John Adams and Alexander Hamilton, denounced the French Revolution as excessively radical and violent. Historians Pierre Bourdieu and Stanley Hoffmann have argued that the root of anti-French sentiment in the U.S. dates back to 18th-century American perceptions of French sociopolitical systems as threats to republicanism in the United States. The Federalist Party in particular was hostile to secularism in France.

After the French Revolution, the U.S. government refused to pay debts owed to France, arguing that they were owed to the ancien régime, which no longer existed. The infuriated government of the French First Republic responded by ordering the seizure of American merchantmen bound for British ports to collect the debts. Attempts at diplomatically resolving Franco-American issues led to the XYZ Affair in 1797, which resulted in the Quasi-War breaking out between France and the U.S. a year later. The war led to a wave of anti-French sentiment among Americans, greatly straining France–United States relations.

== 20th century ==
In the Southern United States, some Americans were anti-French for white supremacist reasons. For example, John Trotwood Moore, a Southern novelist and local historian who served as the State Librarian and Archivist of Tennessee from 1919 to 1929, lambasted the French for "intermarrying with the Indians and treating them as equals" during the French colonization of the Americas.

In 1945, the United States Army issued a handbook titled 112 Gripes about the French in an attempt to defuse the hostility of some American soldiers stationed in France, who typically perceived Stereotypes of French people.

In 1990s popular culture, the derogatory phrase "cheese-eating surrender monkeys" began as a joke on The Simpsons in 1995, used by Groundskeeper Willie. National Review contributor Jonah Goldberg claimed credit for making the term known. It is a reference to the defeat of the French Army against Nazi Germany during World War II, the ensuing Armistice of 22 June 1940 being often misconstrued as an unconditional surrender.

== Allegation of missing French-American lobby ==
French historian Justin Vaïsse has proposed that an important cause of public hostility in the US is the small number of Americans of direct or recent French descent. Most Americans of French descent are descended from 17th- and 18th-century colonists who settled in Quebec, Acadia, or Louisiana before migrating to the United States or being incorporated into American territories. French Americans of colonial era Huguenot descent, French Protestant emigrants, have often ceased identification with France.

== Iraq War ==
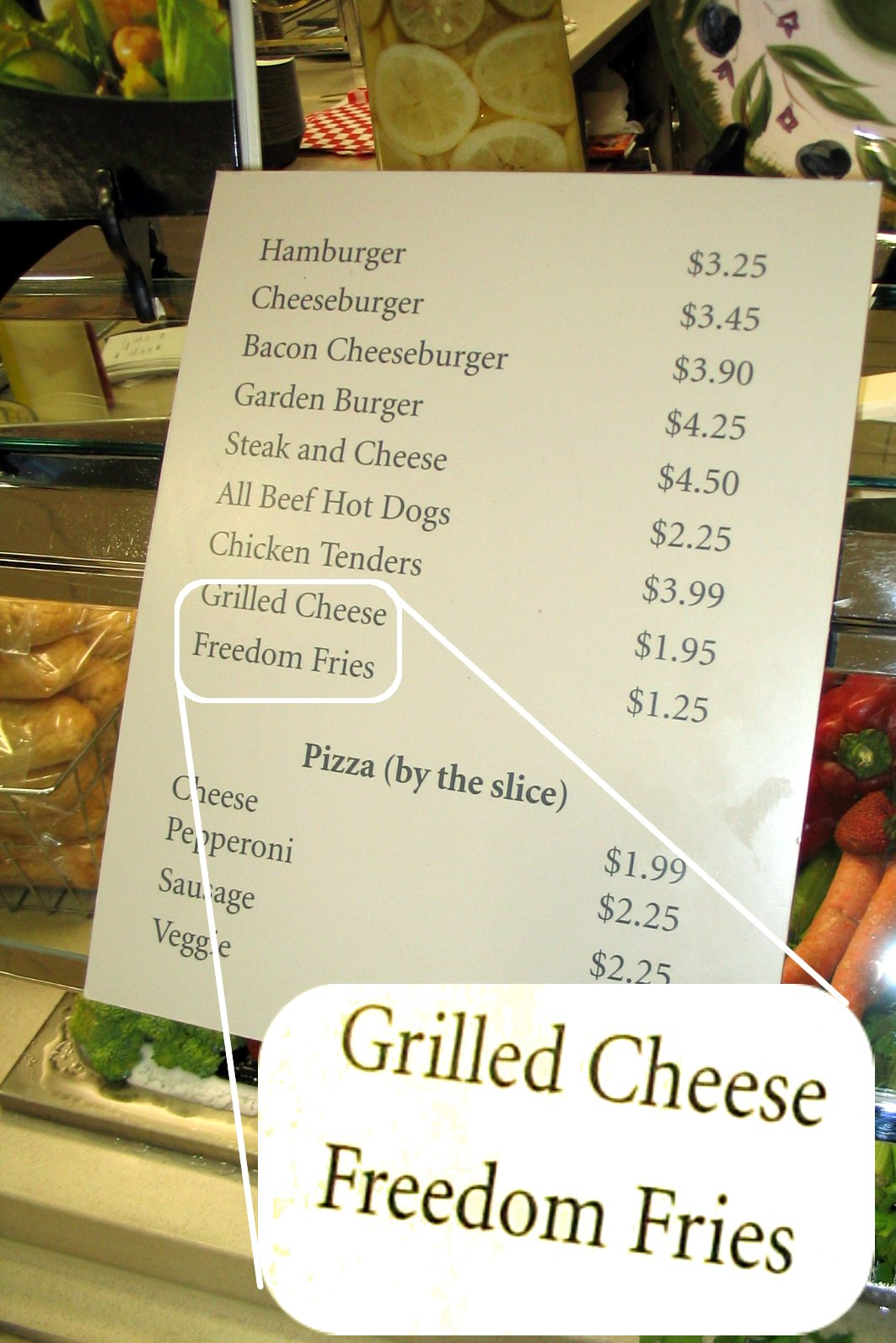
Freedom fries were an initiative of U.S. representatives Robert W. Ney and Walter B. Jones in 2003.

Anti-French sentiment was strong in the wake of France's refusal to support US proposals in the UN Security Council for military action to invade Iraq. While other nations also opposed the US proposals (notably Russia; China; and traditional US allies, such as Germany, Canada, and Belgium), France received particularly ferocious criticism. In a New York Times article in 2003, Thomas Friedman said France's permanent seat at the U.N. Security Council should be given to India because "India is just so much more serious than France these days. France is so caught up with its need to differentiate itself from America to feel important, it's become silly".

In early 2003, George Will from The Washington Post described retreat as "an exercise for which France has often refined its savoir-faire since 1870" (referring to the Franco-Prussian War). Anti-French displays also came in the form of bumper stickers and t-shirts calling for the United States to invade: "Iraq first, France next!" and "First Iraq, then Chirac!". Freedom fries became a political euphemism for french fries. The term came to prominence in 2003 when the then Republican Chairman of the Committee on House Administration, Bob Ney, renamed the menu item in three Congressional cafeterias in response to France's opposition to the proposed invasion of Iraq.

Conservative commentators such as Bill O'Reilly called for the boycott of French goods, which led to a measurable drop in the sale of French wine. Protesters were documented pouring out French wine in the streets. Economic researchers also documented a drop in market share for American products with French-sounding names, such as Grey Poupon mustard. Reckitt Benckiser, maker of French's mustard, issued a statement that the brand was American, and their name was derived from their founder, Robert T. French.

== See also ==
- Anti-Canadian sentiment
- Iraq and weapons of mass destruction
- Racism in the United States
