= France–United States relations =

Relations between France and the US

- France: United States

Diplomatic mission
- Embassy of France, Washington, D.C.: Embassy of the United States, Paris

Envoy
- French Ambassador to the United States Laurent Bili: U.S. Ambassador to France Charles Kushner

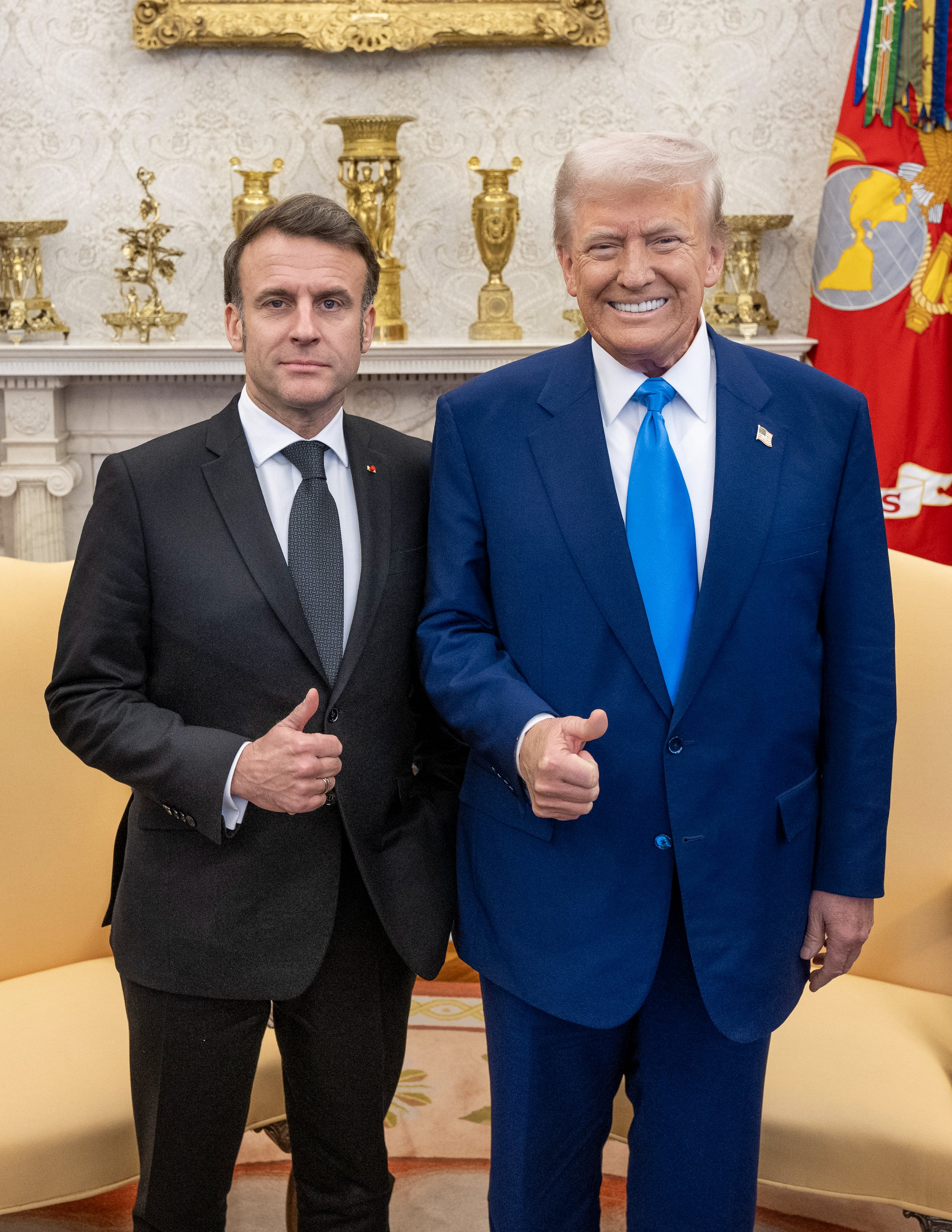
French President Emmanuel Macron with U.S. President Donald Trump in the Oval Office of the White House on 24 February 2025

The Kingdom of France was the first country to have diplomatic ties with the United States, with the 1778 Treaty of Alliance and subsequent French aid proving decisive in American victory over Great Britain in the American Revolutionary War.

French–United States relations have remained peaceful since, with the exceptions of the Quasi-War and American combat against Vichy France (while supporting Free France) during World War II. In 1803, the United States purchased the territory of Louisiana from France to acquire a total of 828,000 sq mi (2,140,000 km^{2}; 530,000,000 acres) and expand westwards. Tensions, however, rose during the American Civil War, as France intervened militarily in Mexico and entertained the possibility of recognizing the separatist Confederate States of America, the defeat of which was followed by the United States sending a large army to the Mexican border and forcing the withdrawal of French forces from Mexico.

Since 2000, the United States and France have continued to work together on a range of issues, such as counterterrorism, climate change, and trade. However, there was sharp disagreement over the Iraq War in 2003. Relations improved again starting in 2010.

== History ==
=== Early history ===
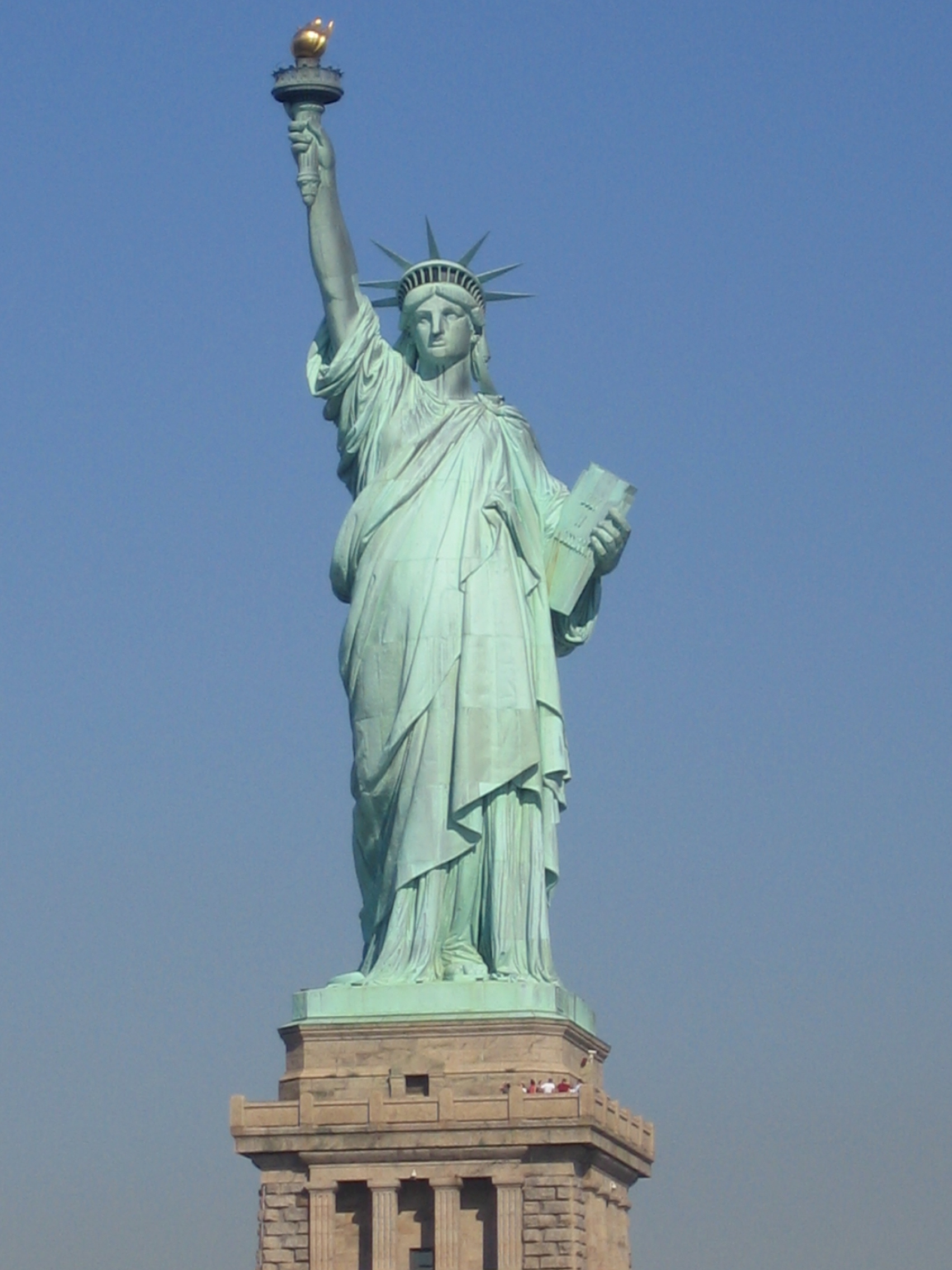
The Statue of Liberty is a gift from the French people to the American people in memory of the United States Declaration of Independence.

New France (French: Nouvelle-France) was the area colonized by France beginning with exploration in 1534 and ending with cession in 1763. The vast territory of New France consisted of five colonies at its peak in 1712, and it extended from Newfoundland to the Canadian Prairies and from Hudson Bay to the Gulf of Mexico, including all the Great Lakes of North America. Great Britain, having won the French and Indian Wars, finally removed the French from continental North America in 1763, with almost all of New France ceded to Britain and Spain through the Treaty of Paris. Within a decade, the Thirteen Colonies revolted openly. In retaliation, France secretly provided troops and war materials to the American independence movement. After the Second Continental Congress declared independence in July 1776, its representatives in Paris recruited officers for the Continental Army, most notably the Marquis de Lafayette, who served with distinction as a major general. After the U.S. victory at the Battle of Saratoga in October 1777, the French concluded treaties of commerce and alliance on February 6, 1778, committing themselves to fight Britain until the independence of the United States was secured.

Six years after the 1783 Treaty of Paris ended the Revolutionary War, the French Revolution overthrew the Bourbon regime. In the beginning, the United States was supportive of the changes in France, where the absolute hereditary monarchy was replaced by a constitutional republic. However, as the situation in France deteriorated, with the revolutionary government becoming more authoritarian and brutal, the United States' sympathy waned. Catherine Hebert reports that French visitors before 1790 made highly favorable reports of American culture, influenced perhaps by the ideals of the noble savage and the American acceptance of the Enlightenment. However the Royalist exiles who came in the 1790s responded in a highly negative fashion to republicanism.

In 1800, Spain returned its portion of Louisiana to France, which then sold it all to the United States in the Louisiana Purchase of 1803, permanently ending French colonial efforts on the American mainland, following the French defeat in Saint Domingue to the Haitian Revolution that led to create the world's first black-led republic, known as Haiti. In the United States, the legacy of New France includes numerous place names as well as pockets of French-speaking communities.

During the American Civil War, 1861–65, French leader Napoleon III favored the Confederate States of America, hoping to weaken the United States, gain a new ally in the Confederacy, safeguard the cotton trade and protect his large investment in controlling the Second Mexican Empire. Napoleon III took advantage of the war in 1863, when he installed Austrian archduke Maximilian of Habsburg on the Mexican throne. Washington protested and refused to recognize the new government. Seeking to avoid war with France, Secretary of State William Seward cautiously limited aid to the Mexican rebels until the Confederacy was near defeat. By 1865, United States diplomatic pressure coupled with the massing of US soldiers on the border with Mexico persuaded Napoleon III to withdraw French troops and support. The democratic Mexican government was soon restored and Maximilian executed.

The removal of Napoleon III in 1870 after the Franco-Prussian War helped improve Franco–American relations. In subsequent years the balance of power in the relationship shifted as the United States, with its very rapid growth in wealth, industry and population, came to overshadow the old powers. Trade was at a low level, France minimized the activity of American banks and insurance companies, tariffs were high, and mutual investments were uncommon. All during this period, the relationship remained friendly—as symbolized by the Statue of Liberty, presented in 1884 as a gift to the United States from the French people. From 1870 until 1918, France was the only major republic in a Europe of monarchies, which endeared it to the United States.

=== World Wars ===
Though initially neutral in World War I, Washington provided much-needed money—as loans to be repaid—that purchased American food, oil and chemicals for the French effort throughout the conflict. The first wave of initial American soldiers used French artillery, airplanes and tanks in combat, having brought no heavy equipment (so that the ships could carry more soldiers). In 1918 the United States sent over two million combat troops; they gave the Allies a decisive edge, as the Germans virtually collapsed by September 1918.

During the interwar years, the two nations remained friendly. Beginning in the 1920s, U.S. intellectuals, painters, writers, and tourists were drawn to visit because of their interest in French culture. However, anti-Americanism came of age in the 1920s, as many French traditionalists were alarmed at the power of Hollywood and warned that America represented a modernity that would overpower French traditions.

In the approach to the Second World War the United States helped France arm its air force against the Nazi threat. However, fewer than 200 U.S. warplanes could be delivered before France surrendered in 1940. Between 1940 and 1942, the US maintained diplomatic relations with the Vichy France, which were severed after the allied landing in Africa. The US stance towards De Gaulle was hesitant, as the US preferred to support his rivals, admiral Francois Darlan and general Henri Giraud, until De Gaulle took over the control over the French Resistance by 1944.

In 1944, the U.S. Third Army under General Patton pushed the German Army from the country, first sweeping across northern France before going on to liberate Lorraine.

=== Cold War ===
In the postwar years, both cooperation and discord persisted. In 1949 the two again became formal allies through the North Atlantic Treaty, which set up the NATO military alliance. Although the United States openly disapproved of French efforts to regain control of colonies in Africa and Southeast Asia, it supported the French government in fighting the Communist uprising in French Indochina. France somewhat reluctantly joined the American leadership in the Cold War to contain the Soviet Union, despite a large Communist presence in French politics. U.S. Treasury loans and cash grants were given in 1945–47, and especially the Marshall Plan gave large sums (1948–51). The total of all American grants and credits to France from 1946 to 1953 amounted to $4.9 billion. Some French businesses resisted Americanization, but the most profitable, especially chemicals, oil, electronics, and instrumentation, seized upon the opportunity to attract American investments and build a larger market. For example, the U.S. insisted on opportunities for Hollywood films, and the French film industry responded with new life.

A major crisis came in 1956 when France, Britain, and Israel attacked Egypt, which had recently nationalized the Suez Canal. Eisenhower forced them to withdraw. By exposing their diminished international stature, the Suez Crisis had a profound impact on the UK and France: the UK subsequently aligned its Middle East policy to that of the United States, whereas France distanced itself from what it considered to be unreliable allies and sought its own path. The two nations also differed over the waging of the Vietnam War, in part because French leaders were convinced that the United States could not win. The French popular view of the United States worsened at the same period, as it came to be seen as an imperialist power.

Relations improved somewhat after Charles de Gaulle lost power in 1969. France, more strongly than any other nation, has seen the European Union as a method of counterbalancing American power, and thus works towards such ends as having the Euro challenge the preeminent position of the United States dollar in global trade and developing a European defense initiative as an alternative to NATO. Overall, the United States had much closer relations with the other large European powers, Great Britain, Germany and Italy.

=== Middle East conflict ===
France under President François Mitterrand supported the 1991 Persian Gulf War in Iraq as a major participant under Operation Daguet. The French Assemblee Nationale even took the "unprecedented decision" to place all French forces in the Gulf under United States command for the duration of the war.

==== 9/11 ====
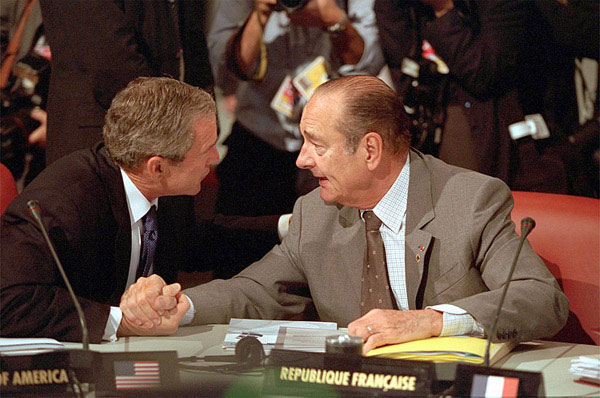
George W. Bush and Jacques Chirac during the 27th G8 summit, 2001

All the left and right wing political elements in France strongly denounced the acts of the Al-Qaeda terrorists in the 9/11 attack in 2001. President Jacques Chirac —later known for his frosty relationship with President George W. Bush—ordered the French secret services to collaborate closely with U.S. intelligence, and created Alliance Base in Paris, a joint-intelligence service center charged with enacting the Bush administration's war on terror. However, all the political elements rejected the idea of a full-scale war against Islamic radical terrorism. Memories of the Algerian war, and its disastrous impact on French internal affairs, as well as more distant memories of its own failed Indochina/Vietnam war, played a major role. Furthermore, France had a large Islamic population of its own, which Chirac could not afford to alienate. As a consequence, France refused to support any American military efforts in the Middle East. Numerous works by French novelists and film makers criticized the American efforts to transform the 9/11 terrorist attacks into a justification for war.

==== Iraq War ====
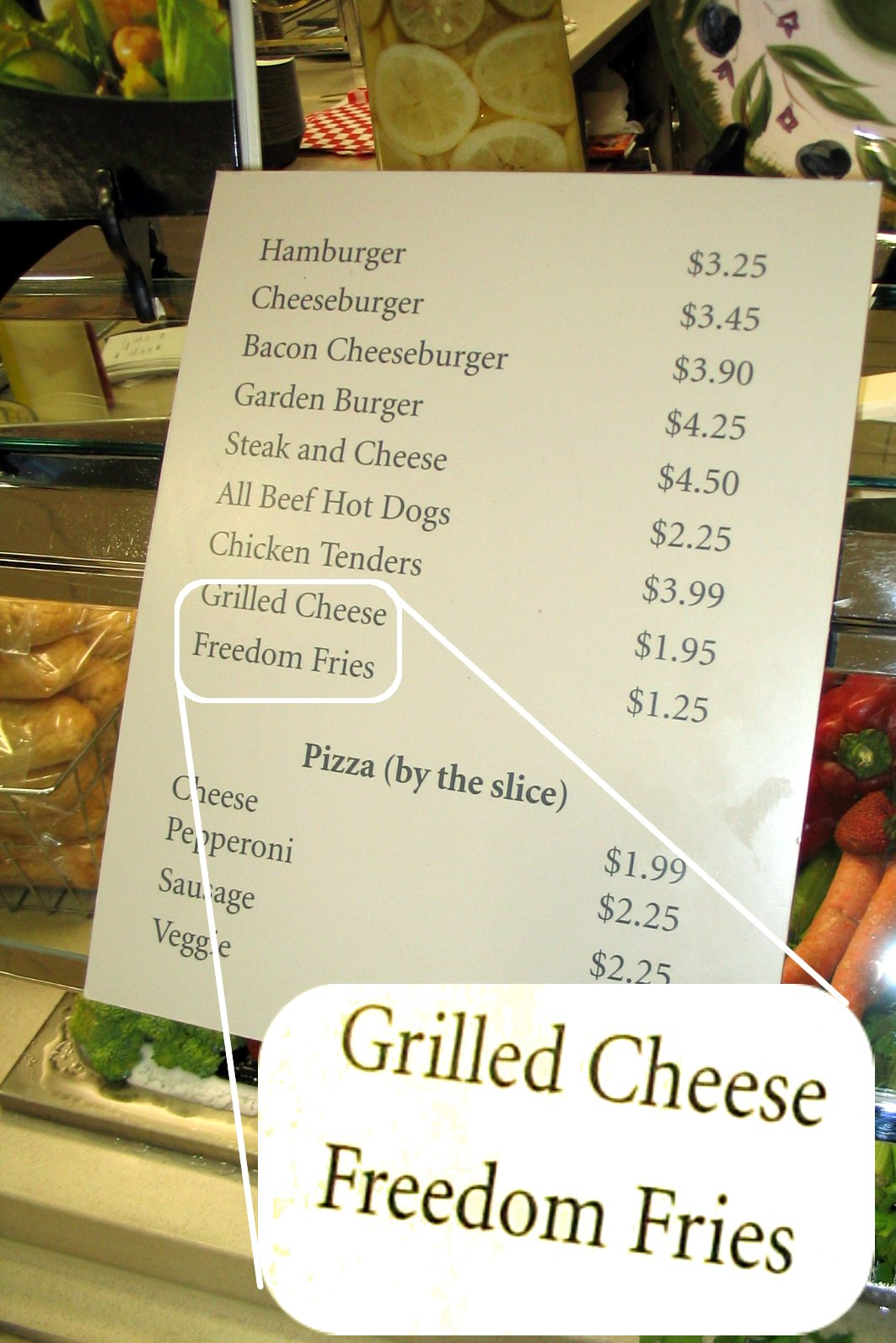
Menu from a congressional cafeteria featuring freedom fries

In March 2003 France, along with Germany, China, and Russia, opposed the proposed UN resolution that would have authorized a U.S. invasion of Iraq. During the run-up to the war, French foreign minister Dominique de Villepin emerged as a prominent critic of the American Iraq policies. Despite the recurring rifts, the often ambivalent relationship remained formally intact. The United States did not need French help, and instead worked closely with Britain and its other allies.

Angry American talk about boycotting French products in retaliation fizzled out, having little impact beyond the short-lived renaming of French fries as "Freedom fries." Nonetheless, the Iraq war, the attempted boycott, and anti-French sentiments caused a hostile negative counter reaction in Europe. By 2006, only one American in six considered France an ally of the United States.

The ire of American popular opinion toward France during the run-up to the 2003 Iraq Invasion was primarily due to the fact that France threatened to use its United Nations Security Council veto power to block U.N. resolutions favorable to authorizing military action, and decided not to intervene in Iraq itself (because the French did not believe the reasons given to go to war, such as the supposed link between Saddam Hussein and Al-Qaeda, and the purported weapons of mass destruction to be legitimate). This contributed to the perception of the French as uncooperative and unsympathetic in American popular opinion at the time. This perception was quite strong and persisted despite the fact that France was and had been for some time a major ally in the campaign in Afghanistan (see for example the French forces in Afghanistan) where both nations (among others in the US-led coalition) were dedicated to the removal of the rogue Taliban, and the subsequent stabilization of Afghanistan, a recognized training ground and safe haven for terrorists intent on carrying out attacks in the Western world.

As the Iraq War progressed, and opposition to the Iraq War amongst Americans increased, relations between the two nations began to improve, and Americans' views of France in general also steadily improved over time. In June 2006 the Pew Global Attitudes Project revealed that 52% of Americans had a positive view of France, up from 46% in 2005. Other reports indicate Americans are moving not so much toward favorable views of France as toward ambivalence, and that views toward France have stabilized roughly on par with views toward Russia and China.

Following issues like Hezbollah's rise in Lebanon, Iran's nuclear program and the stalled Israeli-Palestinian peace process, George Bush urged Jacques Chirac and other world leaders to "stand up for peace" in the face of extremism during a meeting in New York on September 19, 2006.

French and American diplomatic cooperation at the United Nations played an important role in the Cedar Revolution, which saw the withdrawal of Syrian troops from Lebanon. France and the United States also worked together (with some tensions) in crafting UN resolution 1701, intended to bring about a ceasefire in the 2006 Israeli–Lebanese conflict.

=== Sarkozy administration ===
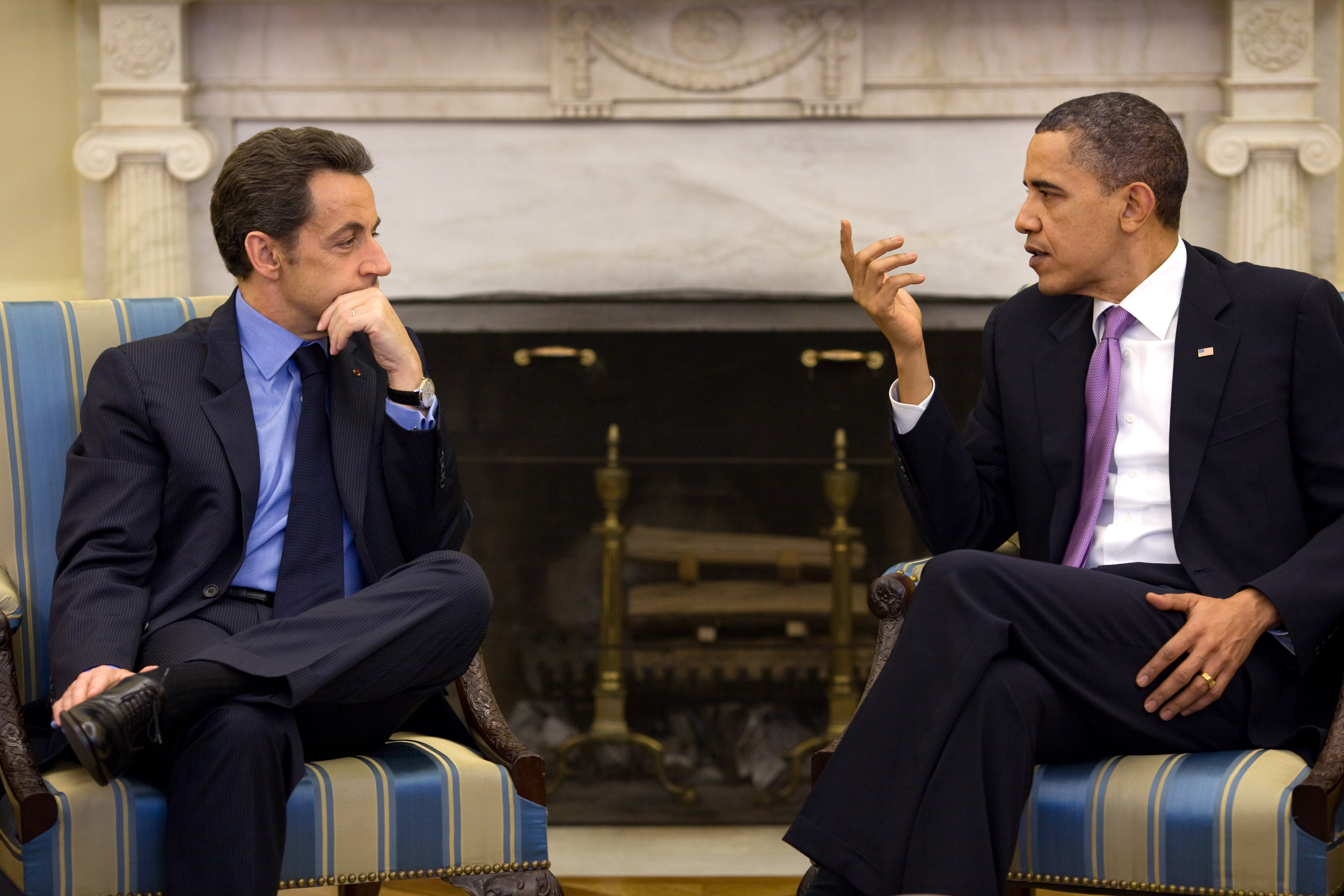
U.S. President Barack Obama and French President Nicolas Sarkozy in the White House in 2010.

Political relations between France and the United States became friendlier after Nicolas Sarkozy was elected President of France in 2007. Sarkozy, who has been called "Sarko the American", has said that he "love[s] America" and that he is "proud of his nickname".

In 2007, Sarkozy delivered a speech before Congress that was seen as a strong affirmation of French-American ties; during the visit, he also met with President George W. Bush as well as senators John McCain and Barack Obama (before they were chosen as presidential candidates). In 2008 Bucharest summit, Bush with Canada, Poland, Romania, the Czechs and the Baltic States, strongly supported Ukraine and Georgia becoming NATO action plan members; however, Sarkozy strongly opposed with Germany, Italy, Spain, the Netherlands and Belgium.

During the 2008 presidential election, Barack Obama and John McCain also met with Sarkozy in Paris after securing their respective nominations. Since 2008, France has returned to the integrated command of NATO, a decision that has been appreciated by the United States.

In 2011 the two countries were part of the multi-state coalition which launched a military intervention in Libya where they led the alliance and conducted 35% of all NATO strikes. However, Sarkozy's interests in Libya as being founded on a desire to gain a greater share of oil production, reservation of part of its oil and gas industry for French firms. In his Memoir A Promised Land (2020), Obama wrote that Sarkozy proved to be duplicitous and thoroughly unreliable.

=== Hollande administration ===
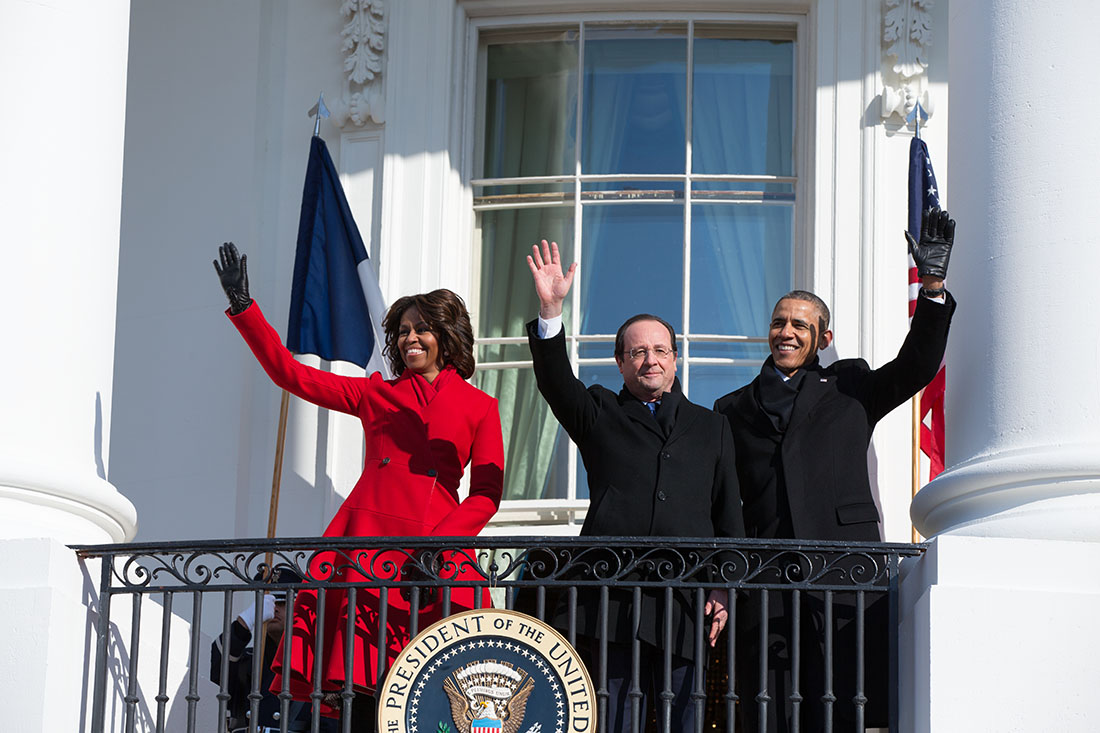
President Barack Obama and President François Hollande in February 2014.

In 2013, France launched a major operation in Mali to free the country from an ad hoc alliance of terrorists and Azawa rebels. The United States provided France with logistical support for Operation Serval.

After president François Hollande pledged support for military action against Syria, U.S. Secretary of State John Kerry referred to France as "our oldest ally". On 10 February 2014, Hollande arrived in the U.S. for the first state visit by a French leader in nearly two decades.

On September 19, 2014, it was announced that France had joined the United States in bombing Islamic State targets in Iraq as a part of the 2014 American intervention in Iraq. United States president, Barack Obama & the Chairman of the Joint Chiefs of Staff, Martin Dempsey, praised Hollande's decision to join the operation: "As one of our oldest and closest allies, France is a strong partner in our efforts against terrorism and we are pleased that French and American service members will once again work together on behalf of our shared security and our shared values." Said Obama.

=== Macron administration ===
==== First Trump presidency 2017–2021 ====
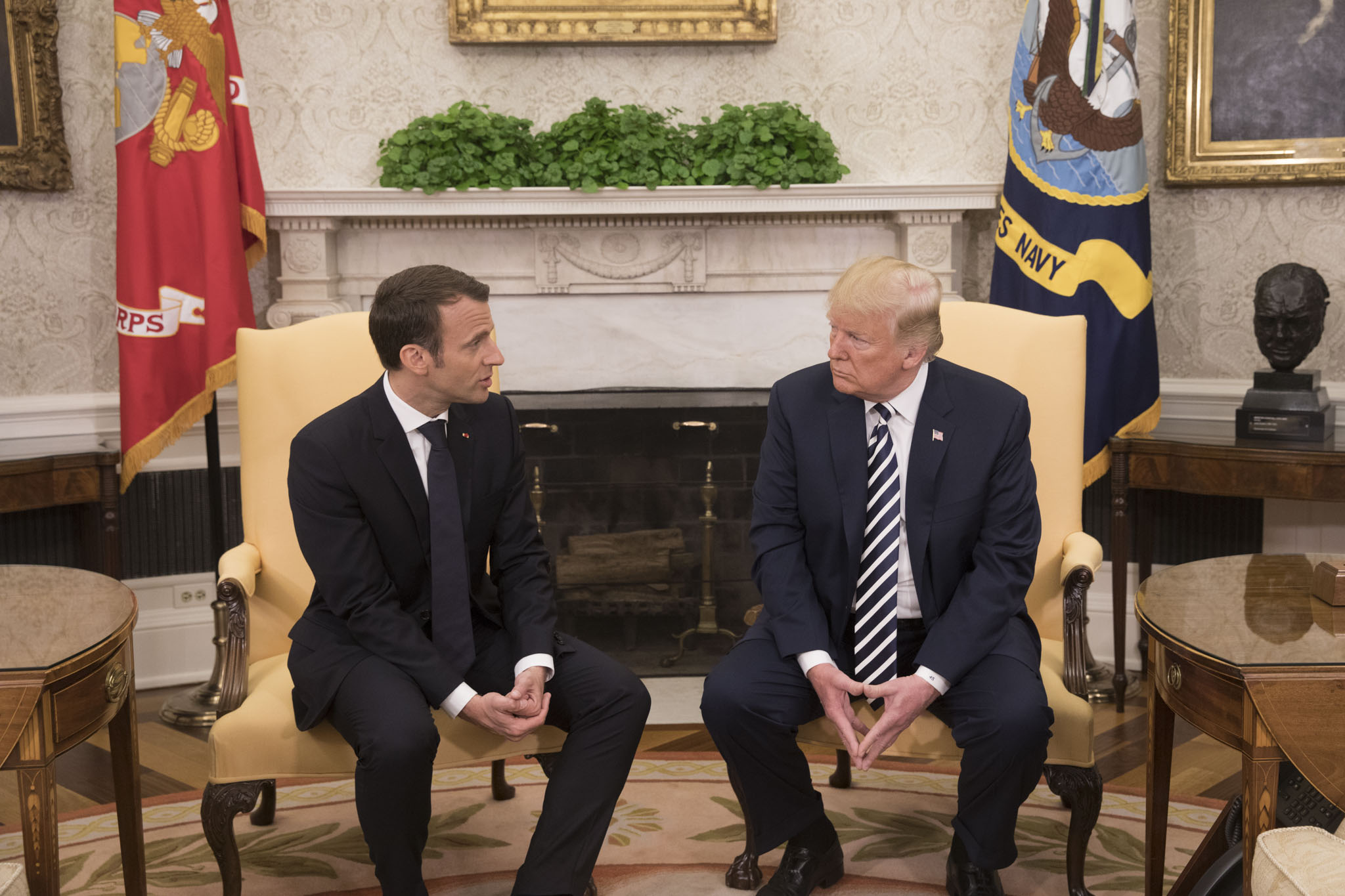
French President Emmanuel Macron (left) and U.S. President Donald Trump (right) meet in Washington, April 2018.

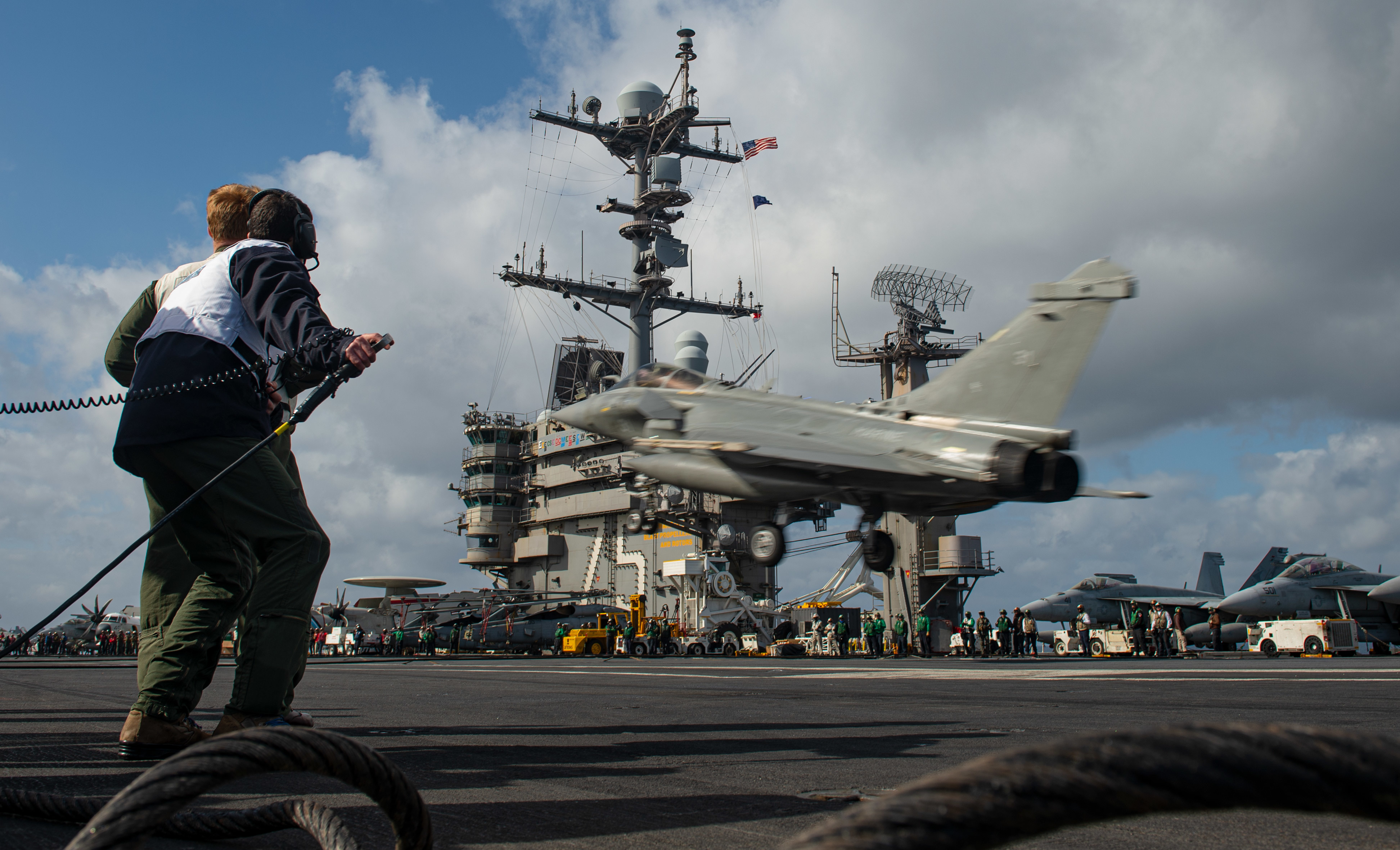
A French Navy Rafale F3-R lands on the USS Harry S. Truman (CVN-75) in the Mediterranean Sea in 2022. The U.S. and France are both members of NATO and cooperate militarily.

==== View on the U.S. as a country bordering the Atlantic Ocean ====
On 12 July 2017, President Donald Trump visited France as the guest of President Emmanuel Macron. The two leaders discussed issues that included counter-terrorism and the Syrian Civil War, but played down topics where they sharply disagreed, especially trade, immigration and climate change.

In April 2018, after Macron spoke to the United States Congress and mentioned his desire that US rejoin the Paris Climate Accords to curb climate change, US congressman Thomas Massie said Macron was "a socialist militarist globalist science-alarmist. The dark future of the American Democratic Party".

In late 2018, Trump ridiculed Macron over nationalism, tariffs, France's World War II defeat, plans for a European army and the French leader's approval ratings. This followed Trump's Armistice Day visit to Paris which was heavily criticized in both France and the United States. In December, Macron criticised Trump over his decision to withdraw US troops from Syria, stating: "To be allies is to fight shoulder to shoulder. It's the most important thing for a head of state and head of the military," and "An Ally Should Be Dependable."

In April 2019, the departing French ambassador to the United States Gérard Araud commented on the Trump administration and the US: "Basically, this president and this administration don't have allies, don't have friends. It's really [about] bilateral relationships on the basis of the balance of power and the defense of narrow American interest... we don't have interlocutors... [When] we have people to talk to, they are acting, so they don't have real authority or access. Basically, the consequence is that there is only one center of power: the White House." On France working with the US: "...We really don't want to enter into a childish confrontation and are trying to work with our most important ally, the most important country in the world."

In November 2019, Macron questioned the U.S. commitment to Europe, stating: "What we are currently experiencing is the brain death of NATO", adding "[NATO] only works if the guarantor of last resort functions as such. I'd argue that we should reassess the reality of what NATO is in the light of the commitment of the United States".

==== 2019 trade wars ====
In March 2019, at a time when China–U.S. economic relations were engaged in a trade war, Macron and Chinese leader Xi Jinping signed a series of 15 large-scale trade and business agreements totaling 40 billion euros (US$45 billion) which covered many sectors over a period of years. The centerpiece was a €30 billion purchase of airplanes from Airbus. The new trade agreements also covered French chicken exports, a French-built offshore wind farm in China, a Franco-Chinese cooperation fund, billions of Euros of co-financing between BNP Paribas and the Bank of China, billions of euros to be spent on modernizing Chinese factories, and new ship building.

In July, Trump threatened tariffs against France in retaliation for France enacting a digital services tax against multinational firms. With Trump tweeting, "France just put a digital tax on our great American technology companies. If anybody taxes them, it should be their home Country, the USA. We will announce a substantial reciprocal action on Macron's foolishness shortly. I've always said American wine is better than French wine!"

French Finance Minister Bruno Le Maire indicated France would follow through with its digital tax plans. French Agriculture Minister Didier Guillaume responded on French TV, "It's absurd, in terms of having a political and economic debate, to say that if you tax the 'GAFAs', I'll tax wine. It's completely moronic."

After Trump again indicated his intentions to impose taxes on French wine over France's digital tax plans, President of the European Council Donald Tusk stated the European Union would support France and impose retaliatory tariffs on the US. In December 2019, the U.S. government stated that it might impose tariffs up to 100% on $2.4 billion in imports from France of Champagne, handbags, cheese and other products, after reaching the conclusion that France's digital services tax would be detrimental to U.S. tech companies.

==== Biden presidency 2021–2025 ====
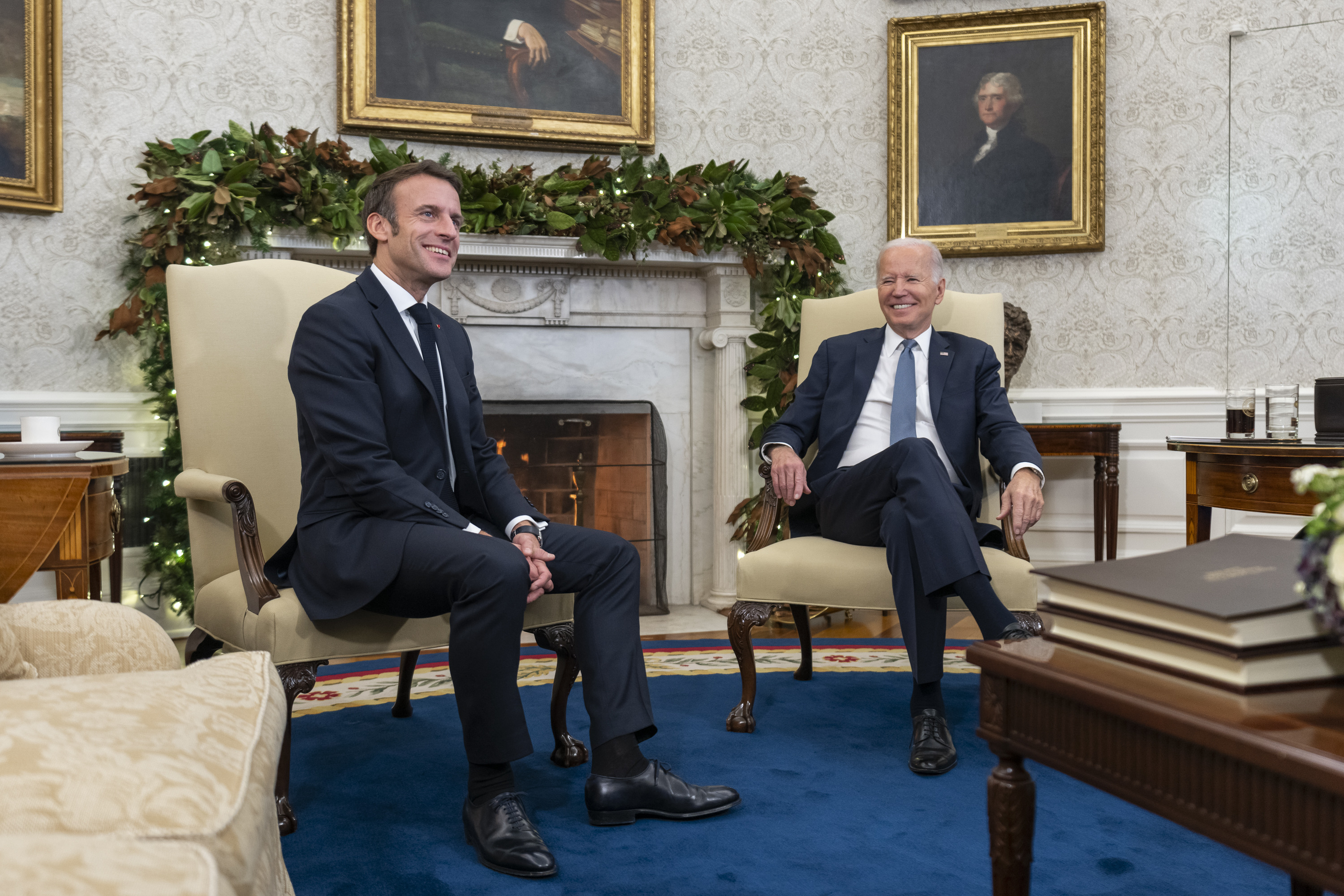
French President Emmanuel Macron (left) and U.S. President Joe Biden (right) meet in Washington, December 2022.

On 17 September 2021, France recalled Philippe Étienne, the French ambassador to the U.S., and Jean-Pierre Thébault, the French ambassador to Australia after the formation of the AUKUS defence technology between the U.S., Australia and UK (from which France was excluded). As part of the new security agreement, the U.S. will provide nuclear-powered submarines to the Royal Australian Navy, and Australia canceled a US$66 billion deal from 2016 to purchase twelve French-built conventionally powered (diesel) submarines. The French government was furious at the cancellation of the submarine agreement and said that it had been blindsided, calling the decision a "stab in the back". On 22 September, President Joe Biden and Macron pledged to improve the relationship between the two countries. Étienne returned to the United States on 30 September.

However in early 2022, France worked closely with the U.S. and NATO in helping Ukraine and punishing Russia for its invasion. During Macron's visit to the U.S. in December 2022, he and President Biden reaffirmed the cooperation between the two countries. They also discussed the war in Ukraine and economic issues.

In April 2023, Macron argued that European countries should not get involved in US confrontation with China over Taiwan. His long-term plan of "strategic autonomy" angered some Republican lawmakers, who called for a re-evaluation of the US-French relationship.

In November 2023, an agreement extended the validity of E-1 and E-2 visas for French traders and investors in the United States from two to four years.

==== Second Trump presidency 2025–present ====
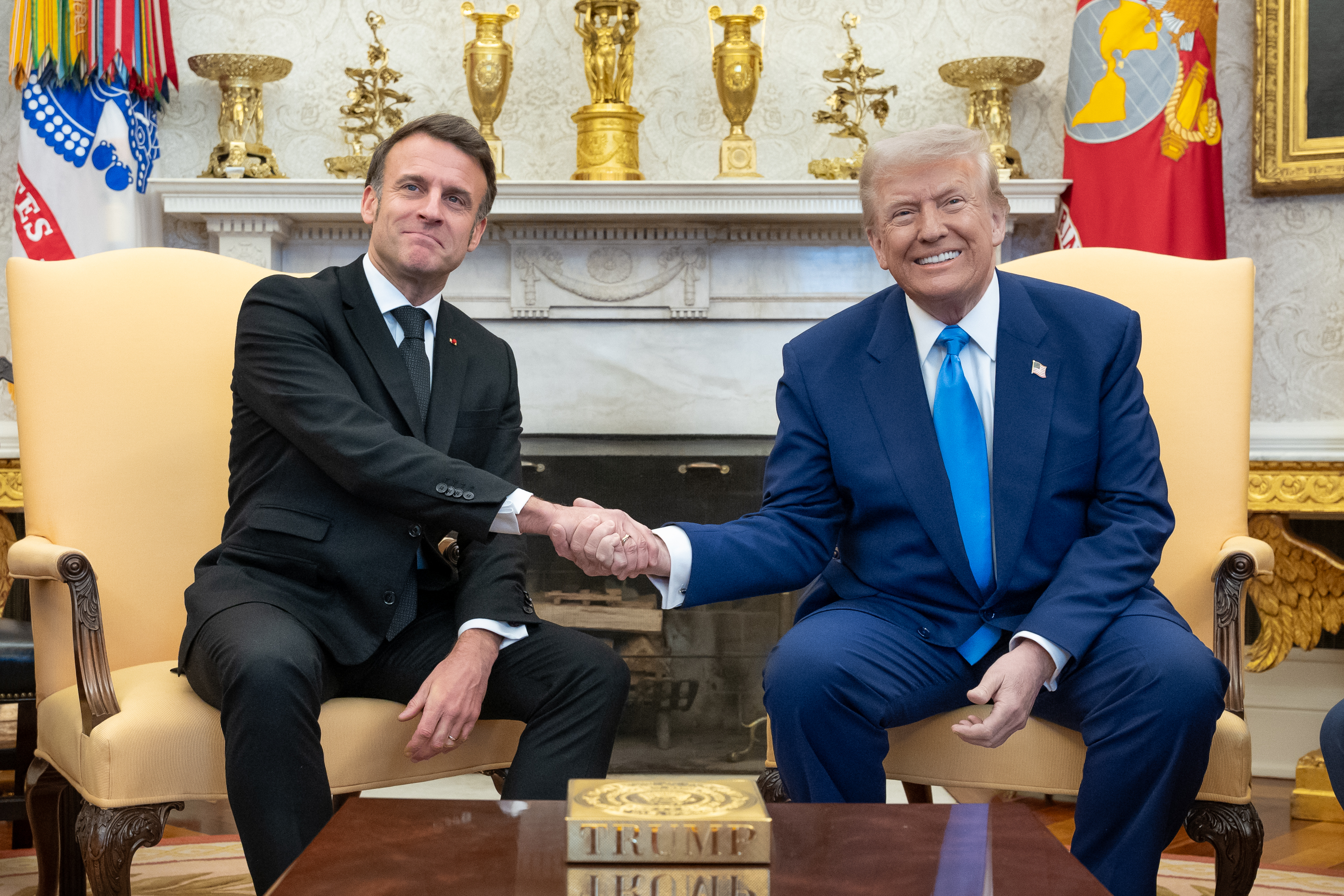
French President Emmanuel Macron (left) and U.S. President Donald Trump (right) meet in Washington, February 2025.

On June 1, 2025, the American ambassador to Israel Mike Huckabee said that if France wants a Palestinian state, it should "carve" it out of the French Riviera.

With Trump's second term, relations between President Macron and President Trump were marked by persistent tension and public friction, with disputes over Greenland crisis emerging as a key flashpoint. While Macron sought to maintain dialogue, Trump repeatedly mocked and publicly criticized him, including sharing private communications. Macron responded with irony and increasingly firm rhetoric, portraying U.S. ambitions toward Greenland as emblematic of destabilizing power politics and warning against a "new colonial approach." France also backed its stance with concrete measures, including military deployments and plans to expand its diplomatic presence in Greenland, while also adopting a tougher line toward U.S. trade pressure.

== Public opinion ==
According to a 2026 Pew Research Center survey, 27% of French people had a favorable view of the United States, while 70% had a negative view.

=== Anti-Americanism ===
Richard Kuisel, an American scholar, has explored how France partly embraced American consumerism while rejecting much of American values and power. He writes in 2013:

America functioned as the "other" in configuring French identity. To be French was not to be American. Americans were conformists, materialists, racists, violent, and vulgar. The French were individualists, idealists, tolerant, and civilized. Americans adored wealth; the French worshiped la douceur de vivre. This caricature of America, which was already broadly endorsed at the beginning of the century, served to essentialize French national identity. At the end of the twentieth century, the French strategy [was to use] America as a foil, as a way of defining themselves as well as everything from their social policies to their notion of what constituted culture.

On the other hand, Kuisel identifies several strong pull effects:

American products often carried a representational or symbolic quality. They encoded messages like modernity, youthfulness, rebellion, transgression, status, and freedom ... There was the linkage with political and economic power: historically culture has followed power. Thus Europeans learned English because it is a necessary skill in a globalized environment featuring American technology, education, and business. Similarly the size and power of U.S. multinationals, like that of the global giant Coca-Cola, helped American products win market shares. Finally, it must be acknowledged, that there has been something inherently appealing about what we make and sell. Europeans liked Broadway musicals, TV shows, and fashions. We know how to make and market what others want.

== Resident diplomatic missions ==
Resident diplomatic missions of France in the United States

- Washington, D.C. (Embassy)
- Atlanta (Consulate-General)
- Boston (Consulate-General)
- Chicago (Consulate-General)
- Houston (Consulate-General)
- Los Angeles (Consulate-General)
- Miami (Consulate-General)
- New Orleans (Consulate-General)
- New York City (Consulate-General)
- San Francisco (Consulate-General)

Resident diplomatic missions of the United States in France

- Paris (Embassy)
- Bordeaux (Consulate-General)
- Lyon (Consulate-General)
- Marseille (Consulate-General)
- Rennes (Consulate-General)
- Strasbourg (Consulate-General)

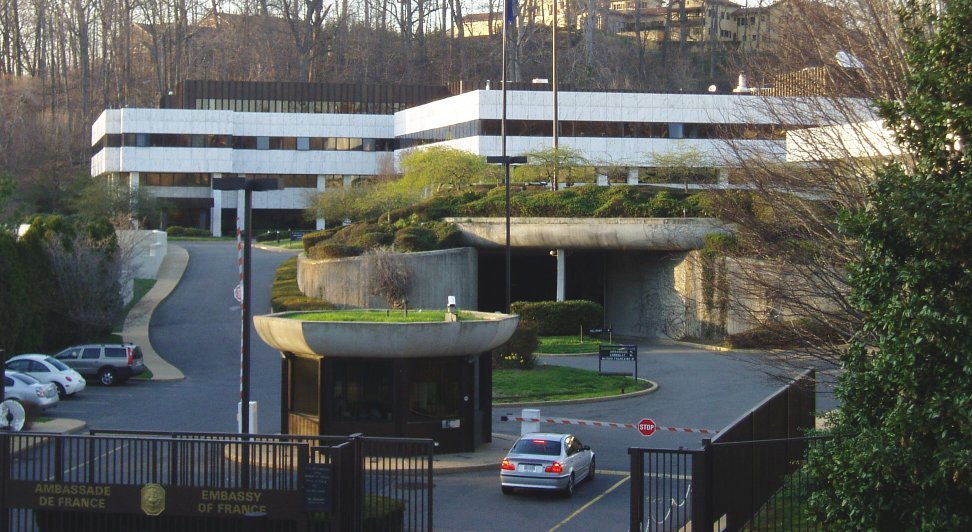
Embassy of France in Washington, D.C.

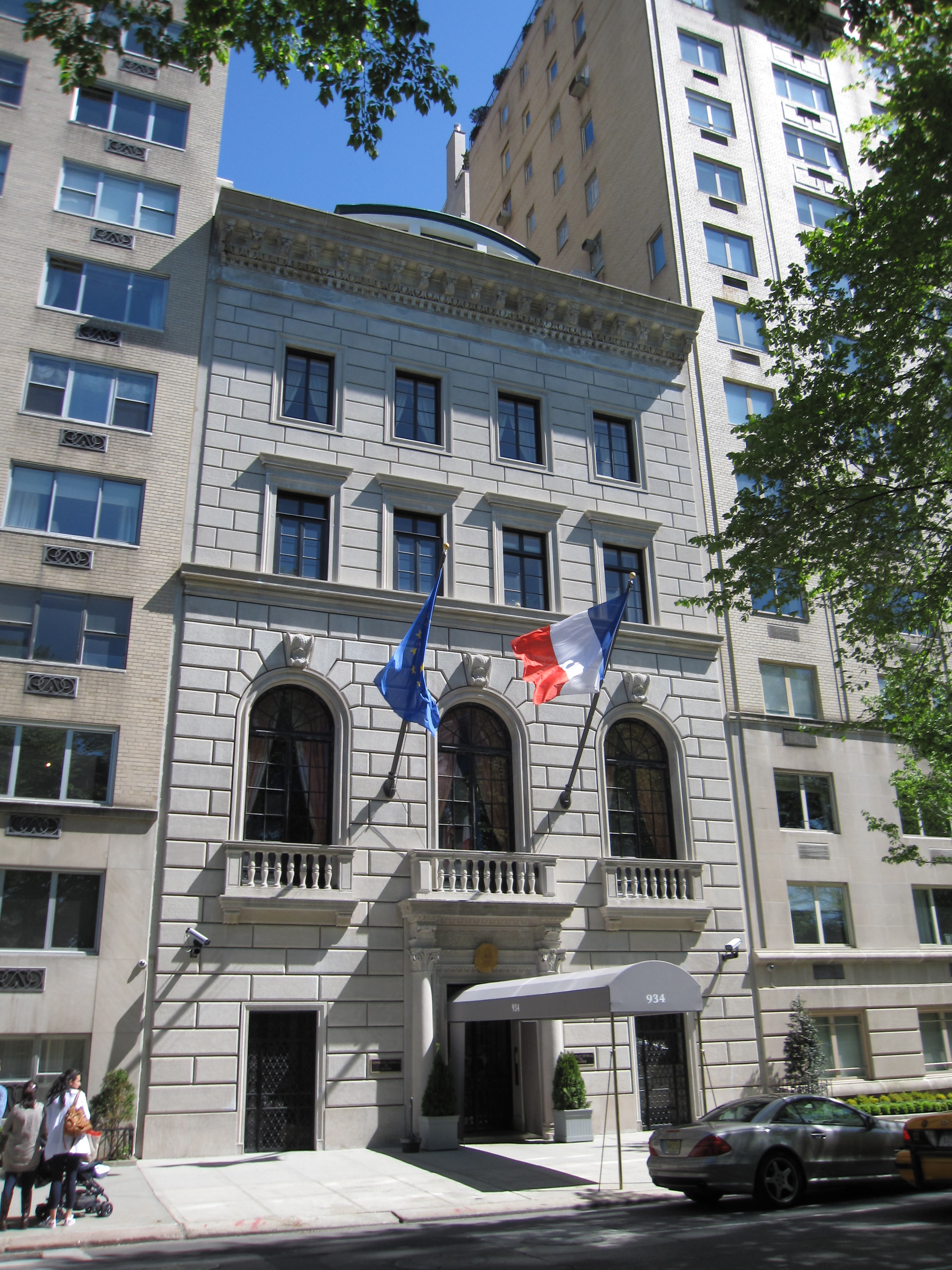
Consulate-General of France in New York City

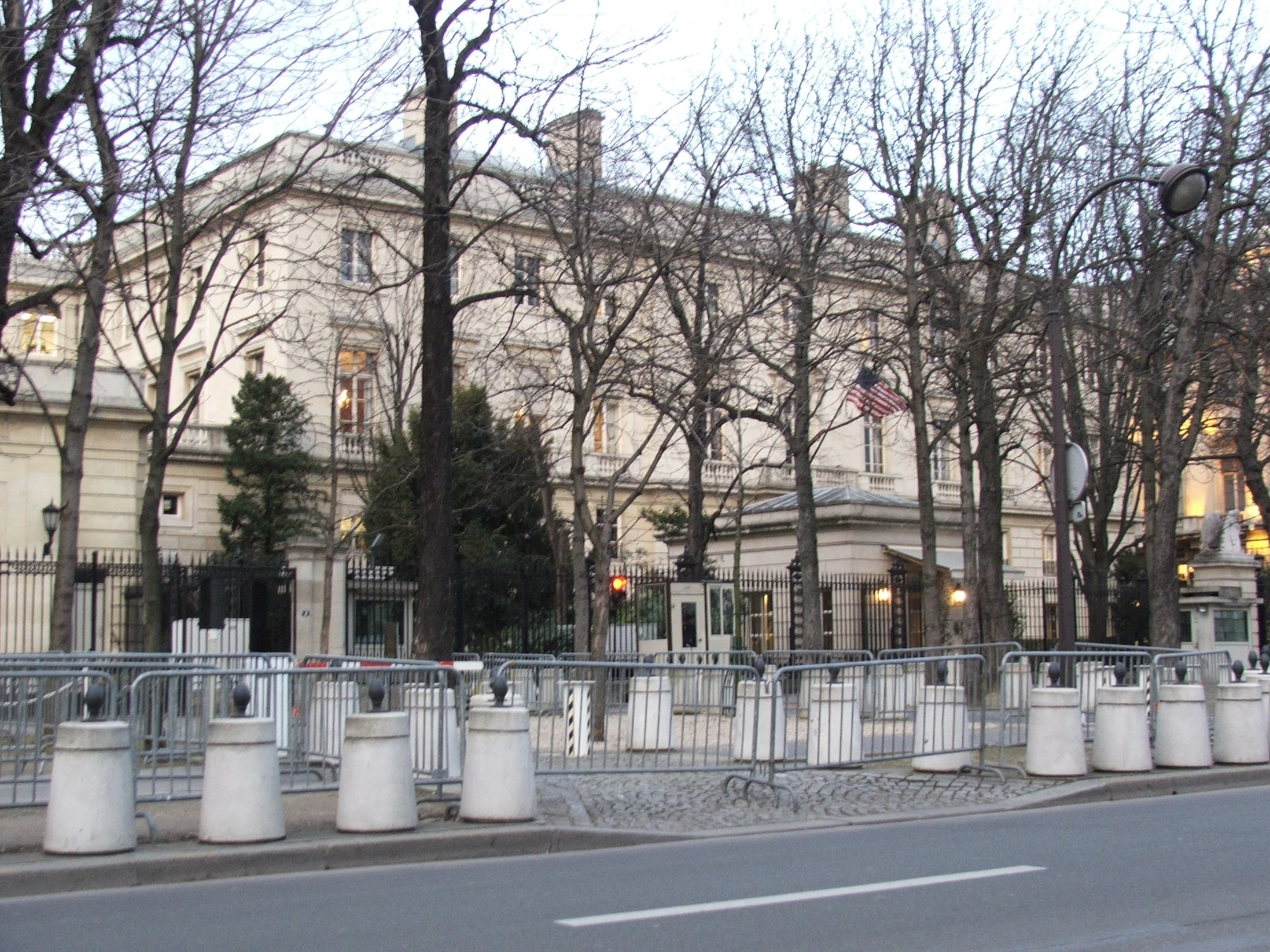
Embassy of the United States in Paris

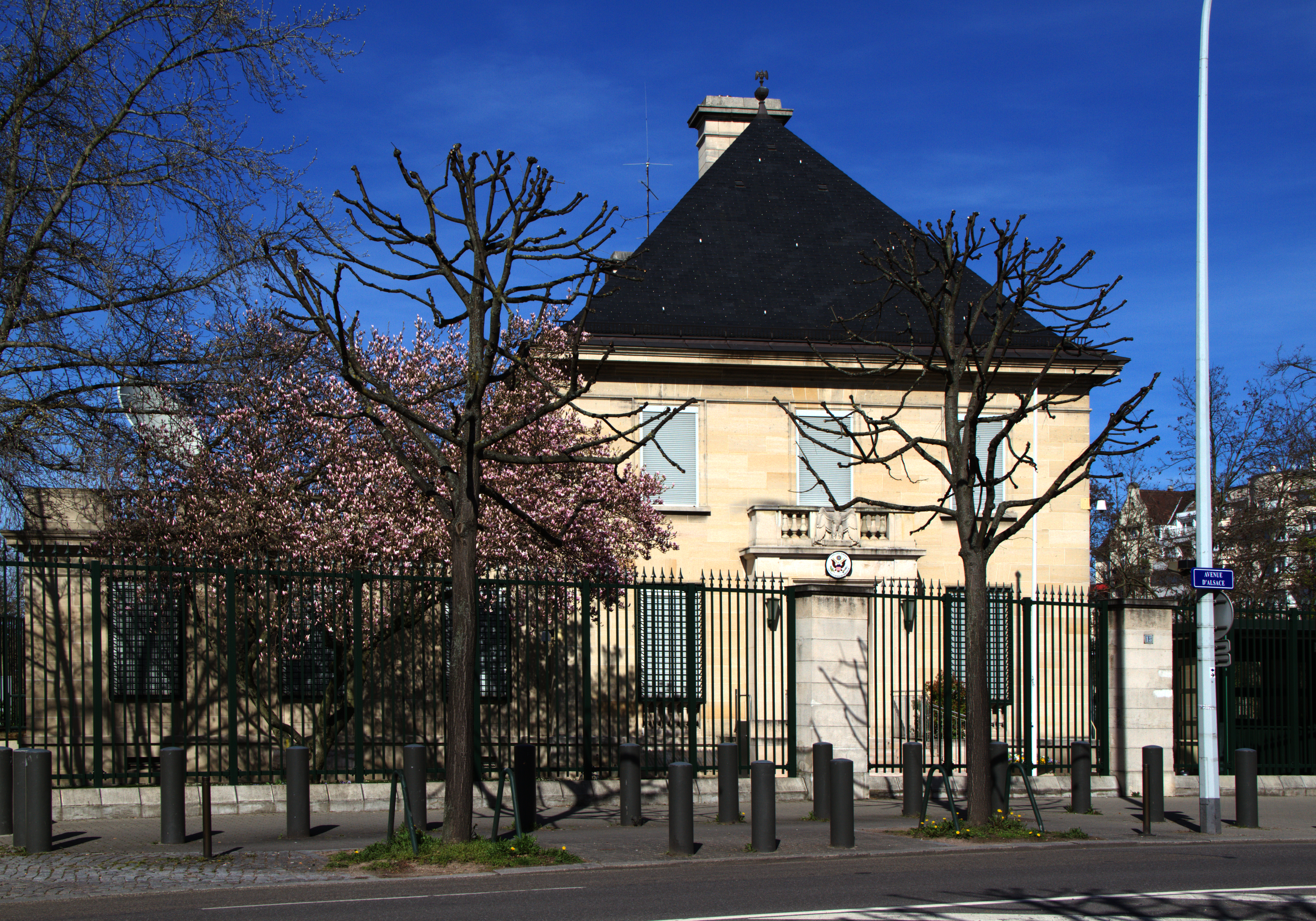
Consulate-General of the United States in Strasbourg

== See also ==
- Americans in France
- Anti-French sentiment in the United States
- Foreign relations of France
- Foreign relations of the United States
- French American
- Strategic autonomy
- US–EU relations
- European Union–NATO relations
- CIA activities in France
