= Freedom fries =

Politically motivated euphemism for French fries

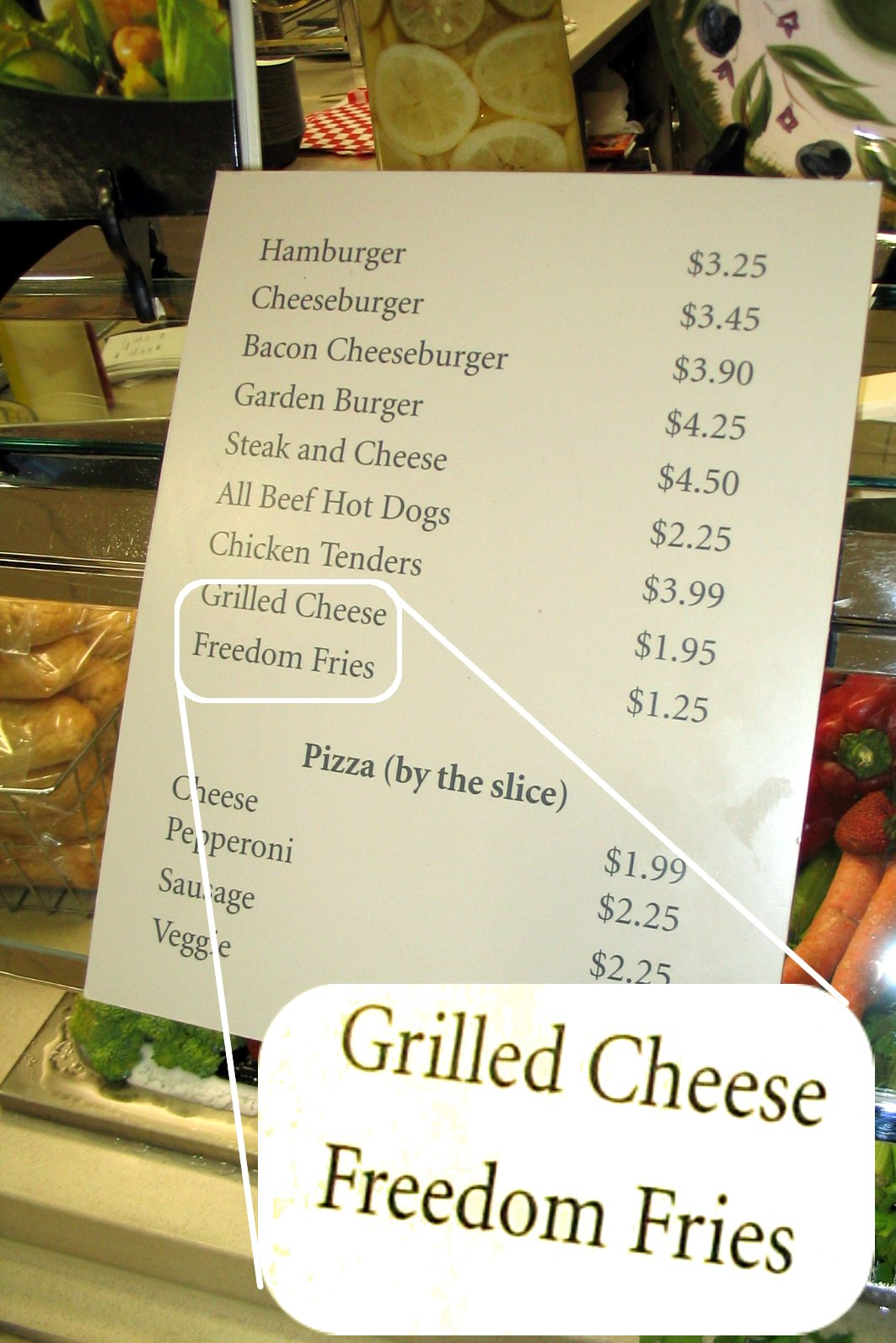
Menu from a Congressional cafeteria featuring freedom fries

Freedom fries was a politically motivated renaming of french fries in the United States. The term was coined in February 2003 in a North Carolina restaurant, and was widely publicized a month later when the Republican Chairman of the Committee on House Administration, Bob Ney, renamed the menu item in three Congressional cafeterias. The political renaming occurred in context of France's opposition to the proposed invasion of Iraq. Although some restaurants around the nation adopted the renaming, the term became unpopular, in part due to decreasing popularity of the Iraq War. After Ney's resignation as Chairman in 2006, the change of name in Congressional cafeterias was reverted.

== Background ==
=== French opposition to the Iraq war ===
After the September 11 attacks by al-Qaeda and the declaration of a "war on terror" by President George W. Bush, an invasion of Iraq was proposed, based on false arguments about Iraq owning weapons of mass destruction. During the United Nations Security Council deliberations, French Minister of Foreign Affairs Dominique de Villepin made it clear France would neither support nor participate in the invasion, and that it would veto any resolution that mandates an invasion of Iraq. Although Russia and China also opposed the invasion, Russian Foreign Minister Igor Ivanov announced on March 10, 2003, that Russia would vote against the proposed Security Council resolution, effectively threatening to veto it. France nevertheless became a prominent target of criticism in the United States over its opposition to the war. Some Americans accused France of betrayal, reigniting existing anti-French sentiment in the United States.

=== Initial renaming ===
Renaming was initiated in February 2003 by Beaufort, North Carolina, "Cubbie's" restaurant owner Neal Rowland, who said he was motivated by similar actions against Germany in World War I, when "sauerkraut was called liberty cabbage, and frankfurters were renamed hot dogs." Even though the liberty cabbage argument was correct, the "hot dog" term predated WWI. In an interview about the name change, Rowland commented, "since the French are backing down [from the war], French fries and French everything needs to be banned." In March 2007, Rowland obtained a trademark registration for the term "freedom fries", which was cancelled in November 2013.

== U.S. House adoption ==
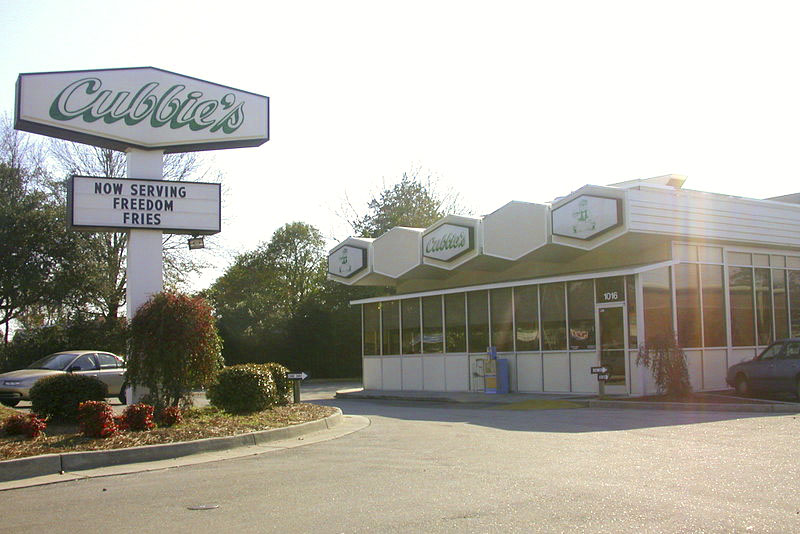
Cubbie's, which was in Jones's district, is where the renaming originated.

On March 11, 2003, Republican U.S. representatives Bob Ney and Walter B. Jones directed the three House cafeterias to change all references to French fries, French toast, and French bread on menus, and replace them with Freedom fries, Freedom toast, and Freedom bread, respectively. Jones chose to follow Cubbie's example by circulating a letter to his colleagues advocating their renaming because, he said, "the French were 'sitting on the sidelines.'" As Ney was Chairman of the United States House Committee on House Administration, the action did not require any vote, as the Committee has authority over House cafeterias. According to a statement released by Ney, the renaming was intended to express displeasure with France's "continued refusal to stand with their U.S. allies." The statement further read: "This action today is a small but symbolic effort to show the strong displeasure many on Capitol Hill have with our so-called ally, France." When asked about his view on the change, Jones said it was a "lighthearted gesture." This also came to apply to dining halls for the Coalition Provisional Authority and the Multi-National Force – Iraq during the U.S. occupation of Iraq.

=== Reactions ===
In response to the change, French Embassy spokeswoman Nathalie Loiseau commented "It's exactly a non-issue ... we focus on the serious issues" and noted that fries originated in Belgium. She then remarked that France's position on the change was that they were "in a very serious moment dealing with very serious issues, and we are not focusing on the name [Americans] give to potatoes." After the name reversal, an embassy spokeswoman said: "our relations are definitely much more important than potatoes ... and our relations are back on track."

In a 2005 opinion poll by Gallup, participants were asked if they felt the renaming of French fries and toast was "a silly idea or a sincere expression of patriotism;" 66% answered it was silly, 33% answered it was patriotic, and 1% had no opinion. However, only 15% of participants actually considered using the term "freedom fries"; 80% said they would continue to call them "french fries". Several restaurants followed the House's change. As of 2020, several American restaurants still used the name "freedom fries". Opposing the name change, Saturn Cafe in Santa Cruz, California, changed their menu to "Impeach George W. Bush fries." Meanwhile, Reckitt Benckiser, maker of French's mustard, were sufficiently concerned about the movement to publicly clarify that its brand derived from a family name.

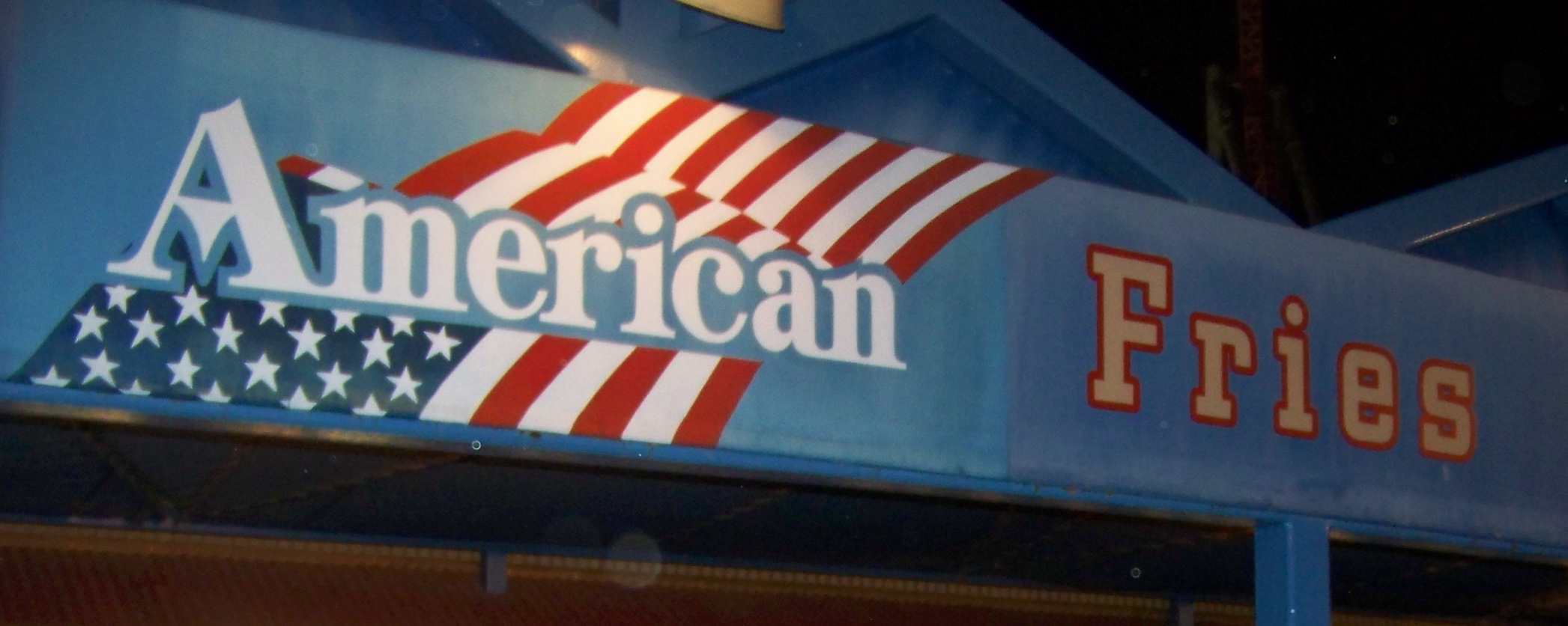
A snack bar sign advertising "American" fries at Knott's Berry Farm. The sign previously read "French".

Massachusetts Democratic congressman Barney Frank noted that the change made "Congress look even sillier than it sometimes looks," New York Democratic Congressman José Serrano characterized the renaming as "petty grandstanding," and urged fellow legislators to concentrate on more pressing issues.

The French American indie band Freedom Fry chose their name based on the Freedom Fries phenomenon. In 2005, Robert Plant and his band Strange Sensation released the album Mighty ReArranger, which contains the track '"Freedom Fries," an anti-war song whose lyrics contains the words "Freedom fries and burns and scars, the liberator goes too far."

=== Policy reversal ===
On August 2, 2006, the House cafeteria menus were changed back without any announcement. The change was made by the new House Administration Committee Chairman, Vern Ehlers, who replaced Ney following his resignation due to a corruption scandal. When asked about his decision, Ehlers responded, "It's no big deal ... It's not news." When asked in 2005 about his opinion on the "freedom fries" episode, Republican representative Walter B. Jones responded, "I wish it had never happened."

== See also ==
- List of politically motivated renamings
- Freedom pineapples
- Star Spangled Ice Cream
- Gulf of Mexico naming controversy
- Lake Ontario naming dispute
