= Graphic charter of government communication in France =

Graphic identity of the government of France

“French Republic” brand block - 2020 version

The graphic charter of government communication is the graphic charter of the logo of France, used by government services. It was adopted in 1999 by the government of Lionel Jospin and revolves around a logo associating Marianne, the tricolour flag and the motto Liberté, Égalité, Fraternité (transl. Liberty, Equality, Fraternity) to represent the French Republic. A redesign of this graphic charter was carried out in 2020.

== History ==
François Mitterrand, when he was the President of the Republic, was offered by Jacques Séguéla the idea of a logo for state institutions. However, he had refused it, deeming it too "publicitaire"

In 1997, the Court of Auditors noted in a report that a “kaleidoscope of different symbols” existed in the publications of the administration. Its author, Bernard Candiard, who then became director of the Service d'information du Gouvernement (SIG or transl. Government Information Service), launched the project of creating a logo within this organization, with Nicole Civatte. The objective was to "create an identifier of the State which would clearly indicate that the State exists as a specific issuer: a place where an autonomous word has to be affirmed", according to an internal document issued in March 1999 by SIG.

A call for tenders was launched in 1998. The creation of the logo was entrusted to the Audour Soum agency (which then merged with the Hémisphère droit agency, a subsidiary of the Séguéla group), with Evelyn Soum as project manager. Designed by graphic designer Isabelle Bauret, the logo met specifications drawn up "at the end of an investigation combining semiotic analysis, interviews with senior officials, as well as meetings with the general public". It was tested by Sofres to the public and government officials before being released. But the President of the Republic, Jacques Chirac, consulted by the government in January 1999, hesitating at first to "touch the integrity of the flag".

The graphic charter was finally introduced by circular n^{o} 4.694 / SG signed by the Prime Minister Lionel Jospin, on 24 September 1999.

The circular n^{o} 5459 / SG signed by the Prime Minister Francois Fillon, on 8 April 2010, changed the graphic charter for decentralised services.

The circular n^{o} 6144 / SG signed by the Prime Minister Edouard Philippe, on 17 February 2020, simplified the graphic charter and made it more suitable for reading on a smartphone.

== Protection ==
The first 1999 version of the logo constituted a graphic mark that the SIG has registered with the National Institute of Industrial Property (INPI) under number 7596745 and under the name “Liberté-Égalité-Fraternité République Française” as well as a Community trade mark.

In addition, since 31 March 2016, the logo is one of the emblems protected under Article 6 of the Paris Agreement.

== First version (1999) ==
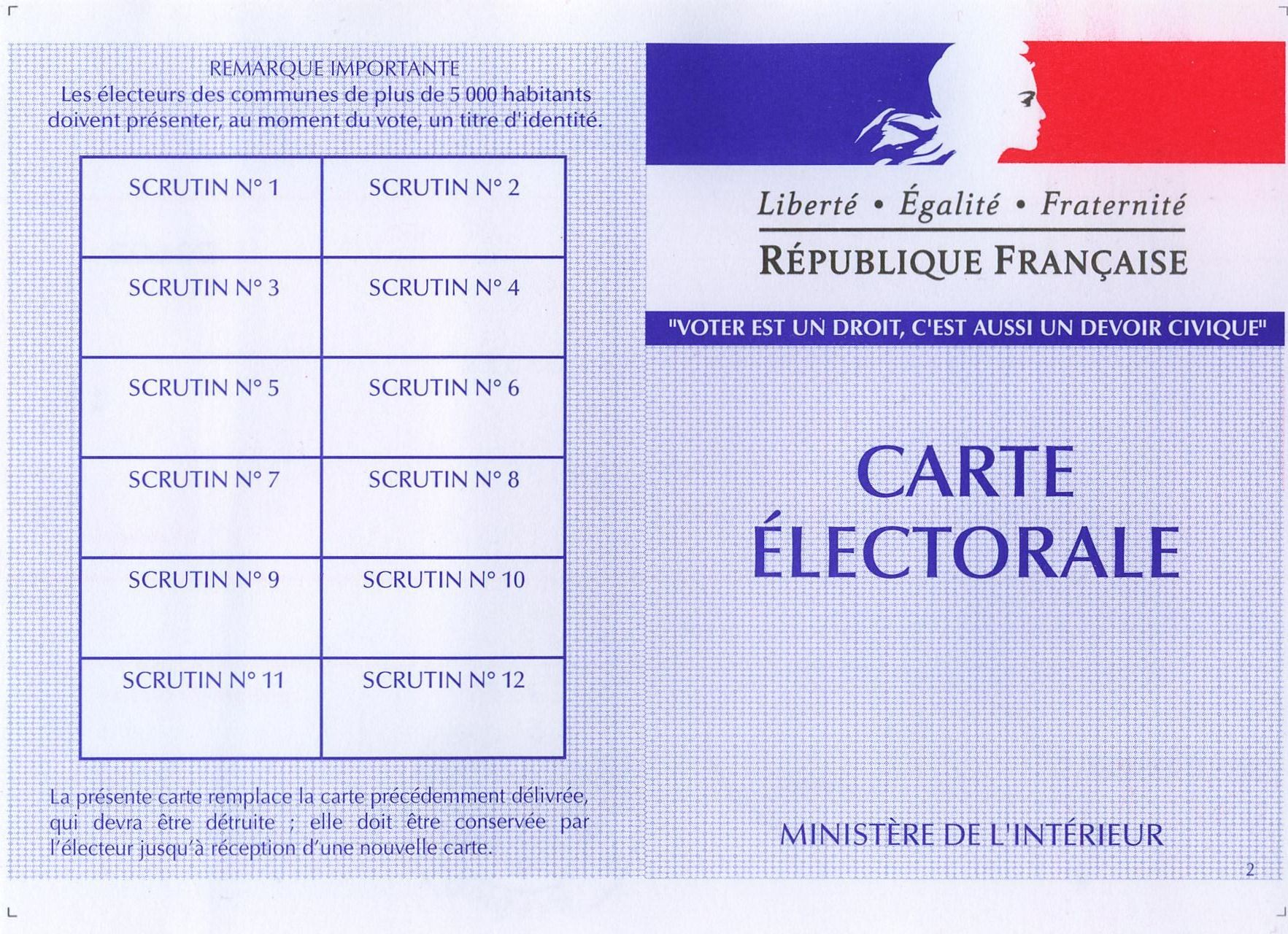
The 1999 logo on a voter card, with different proportions and the slogan “Voting is a right, it is also a civic duty”.

=== Description ===
The logo is reminiscent of the national flag, featuring an elongated rectangular design with the three colours: blue, white, and red. The central white portion showcases a silhouette of Marianne in profile, oriented towards the right.

Beneath the rectangle, there is a typographic base which includes:

- On the first line, the Republic’s motto, “Liberté • Égalité • Fraternité”, is presented in italics, with bullets separating the words.
- On the second line, the phrase “République Française” (transl. French Republic) is displayed. Notably, the ‘F’ in “Française” is capitalised, a deviation from standard capitalization rules, likely introduced for prestige and to evoke the monogram “RF”.

The two lines are separated by a filet.

Colours
Colour	CMYK	Pantone	Monochrome version
Blue	100-80-0-0	Pantone Reflex Blue	N 80
Red	0-100-100-0	Pantone Red 032	N 50
Black	0-0-0-100	Black	N 100

== Second version (2020) ==
=== Description ===
In the first half of 2020, a new graphic charter, referred to as the “State brand”, was introduced. This was produced by the “4uatre” branding agency. The design incorporates key elements from its predecessor, including the depiction of Marianne within a French flag and the inclusion of the Republic’s motto.

The new design expands Marianne’s frame of view to reveal her shoulders. A new typography, named “Marianne”, was created, and the motto “Liberté, Égalité, Fraternité” was hand-redrawn in italics and positioned beneath the official title.

The logo comprises the following elements:

- The Marianne block, which features Marianne in the white section of the tricolour.
- The official title, which could be, for example, “Gouvernement”, “Ministère de la transition écologique et solidaire”, “République française”, etc. This is presented in Marianne Bold font and spans a maximum of six lines.
- The Republic’s motto, “Liberté, Égalité, Fraternité”, displayed over three lines.

Within this brand block, only the official name of the issuer is subject to change, while the typography remains consistent.

=== Typography ===
The Marianne font was created for the State by Mathieu Réguer, commissioned by the agency “4uatre”. It is available in six thickness levels (Thin, Light, Regular, Medium, Bold, Extrabold). As a substitute for this typography, Arial can be used. In addition to Marianne, the Spectral font (created by the Parisian company Production Type for Google in 2017) is authorised for quotes, translations etc.

=== Application ===
The new charter applies, in addition to State administrations (ministries, prefectures, embassies, etc.), to State operators. They will have to affix, in addition to their own logo, the “French Republic” brand block in order to clearly indicate to the public that they belong to the State.

According to the Prime Minister's services, the implementation of the new charter should not generate additional costs, the organizations concerned being supposed to dispose of their old stocks of letterhead.

=== Colours ===
The main colours of the charter are those of the French flag, to which a wide range of secondary colours is also added.

=== Examples of usage of the logo ===
Minister of the Sea

Ministry of the Economy and Finance

Minister in charge of Housing

Consulate General of France at San Francisco

== Usage ==
The 1999 circular specifies that the graphic charter "is intended to be used in all of the ministries' relations with third parties, as well as with other services or bodies under the State". The logo can thus be found on letterheads, business cards, websites, forms, posters etc., published by the government and the administration. The graphic charter applies to ministerial cabinets and central administrations as well as to decentralised services in departments and regions, prefectures and embassies.

The other institutions of the Republic (Presidency of the Republic, National Assembly, Senate, Constitutional Council, Court of Cassation, Council of State, etc.) as well as independent administrative authorities and local authorities generally have their own graphic charter and do not use the government logo.

This logo is moreover a mark and not an official emblem: indeed article 2 of the Constitution of the Fifth Republic officially recognises only the tricolour flag, the hymn La Marseillaise, and the motto Liberty, Equality, Fraternity.

== Reception ==
Bernard Candiard, who headed the SIG when the logo was created in 1999, said that it is a national symbol that "endows the country with a modest banner that allows us to come together". The French Embassy in the United States states that the logo was designed not only to unify government public relations but also to present a more accessible image of the state, which had previously been perceived as abstract, distant, and archaic; the logo aims to unite, mobilise, provide security and optimism, and evoke patriotic pride.

The logo incorporates three symbols of France that originated from the French Revolution: the flag, Marianne, and the motto. Frédéric Lambert noted its inspiration from Eugène Delacroix’s “La Liberté guidant le peuple”, a work from the revolution of 1830.

Adopted during a period of cohabitation, the logo is intended to be consensual, focusing more on communication than passionate symbolism. Bernard Richard observed that its association with administrative documents, such as tax forms and traffic ticket notices, may hinder the popular fervor associated with other French emblems. However, its adoption and recognition by the public are evident, as demonstrated by the viral response to its use following the attacks of November 13, 2015.

Historian Maurice Agulhon described the logo as "having more of a postage stamp aesthetic than that of a logo", noting its similarity to stamps featuring Marianne. The Flags of the World website suggests that the logo blends the two aspects of Marianne described by Agulhon and elaborated by Michel Pastoureau in Les Emblèmes de la France - being both wise and bourgeois, and rebellious and popular.

Additionally, a lack of cohesion among the logos of different ministries was observed.

== Misuses ==
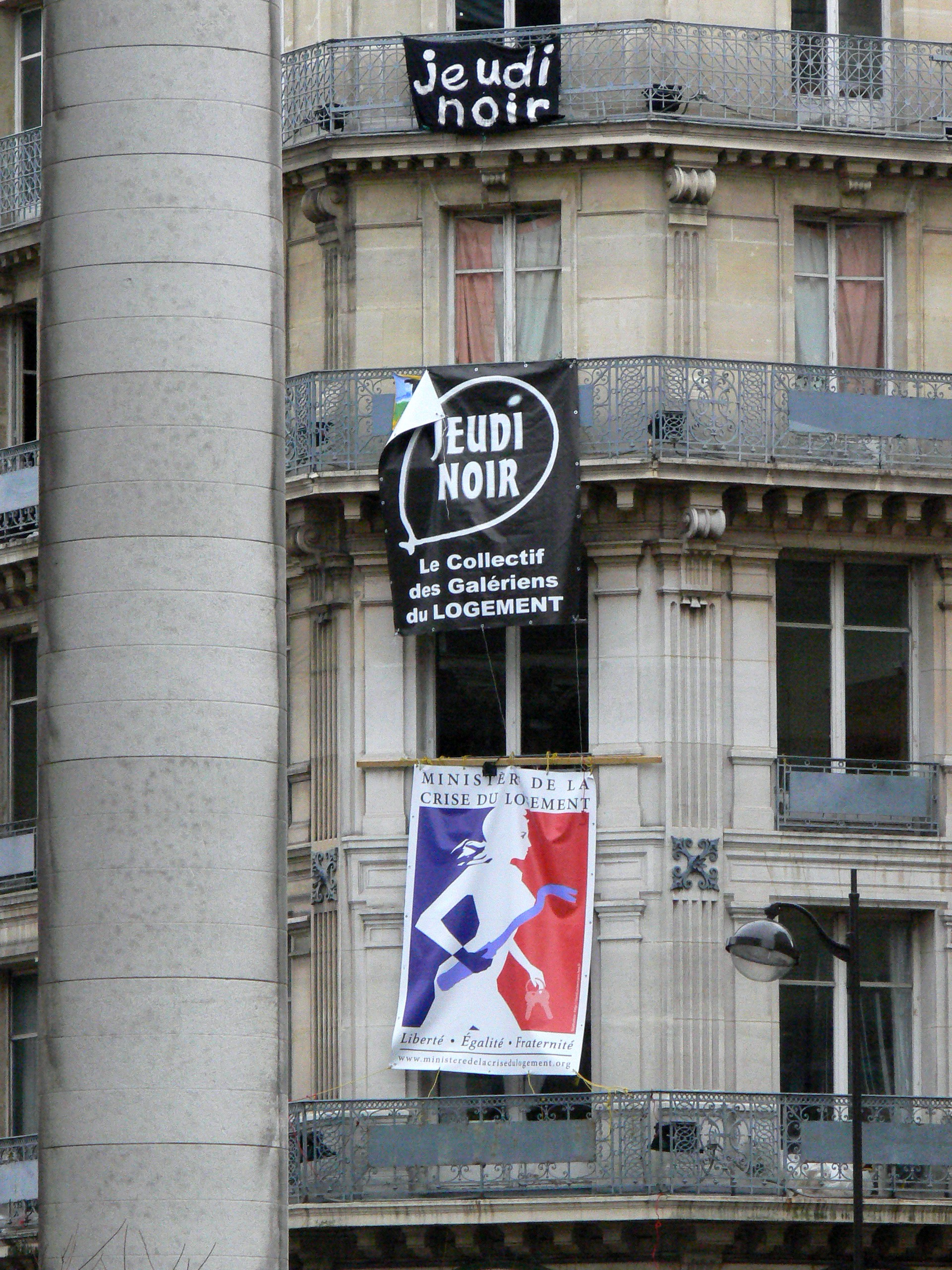
Misappropriation of the logo in 2007

On 11 January 2007, activists from several associations, in particular Droit Au Logement (DAL or transl. Right To Housing), Collectif Jeudi Noir (transl. Black Thursday Collective) and Macaq (abbreviation of Mouvement d’Animation Culturelle et Artistique de Quartier (transl. Movement of Cultural Animation and Artistic District)), denounced the inaction of the public authorities in the housing crisis by inaugurating a fake "Ministry of Housing Crisis" in the 2nd arrondissement of Paris, in the corner of Place de la Bourse and rue de la Banque. A poster diverting the logo of the government was displayed by adding a crowbar and a bunch of keys.

In 2013, in the documentary Trop noire pour être française? (transl. Too Black to be French?), Isabelle Boni-Claverie diverted the logo by replacing the blue of the flag with black and by drawing a black Marianne.

After the attacks of 13 November 2015, graphic designers from the Les Cartons collective hijacked the government logo by adding a tear to the corner of Marianne's eye, in tribute to the victims (of the attacks of 13 November 2015 in France). The visual was widely shared on social networks, and was displayed in Bordeaux on the facade of the Aquitaine regional council.
