= Consulate General of France, San Francisco =

Consular representation of the French Republic in the United States

Consulate General of France in San Francisco
- Location: San Francisco, California
- Address: 44 Montgomery Street - Suite 3400
- Consul General: Florian Cardinaux

The Consulate General of France in San Francisco is a consular representation of the French Republic in the United States. Its jurisdiction covers Northern California, Northern Nevada, and the following states: Alaska, Hawaii, Idaho, Montana, Oregon, Utah, Washington, Wyoming, and the Pacific Islands under American jurisdiction (Guam and American Samoa). The consulate is currently located near the French quarter of San Francisco, on 44 Montgomery Street.

Under the authority of the Minister of European and Foreign Affairs, the Consulate General of France is responsible for the protection and administrative affairs of French nationals settled or traveling within the American Northwest.

The Consulate provides many services to the French community and those who desire to travel to France.

== Consular services ==
=== Visas ===
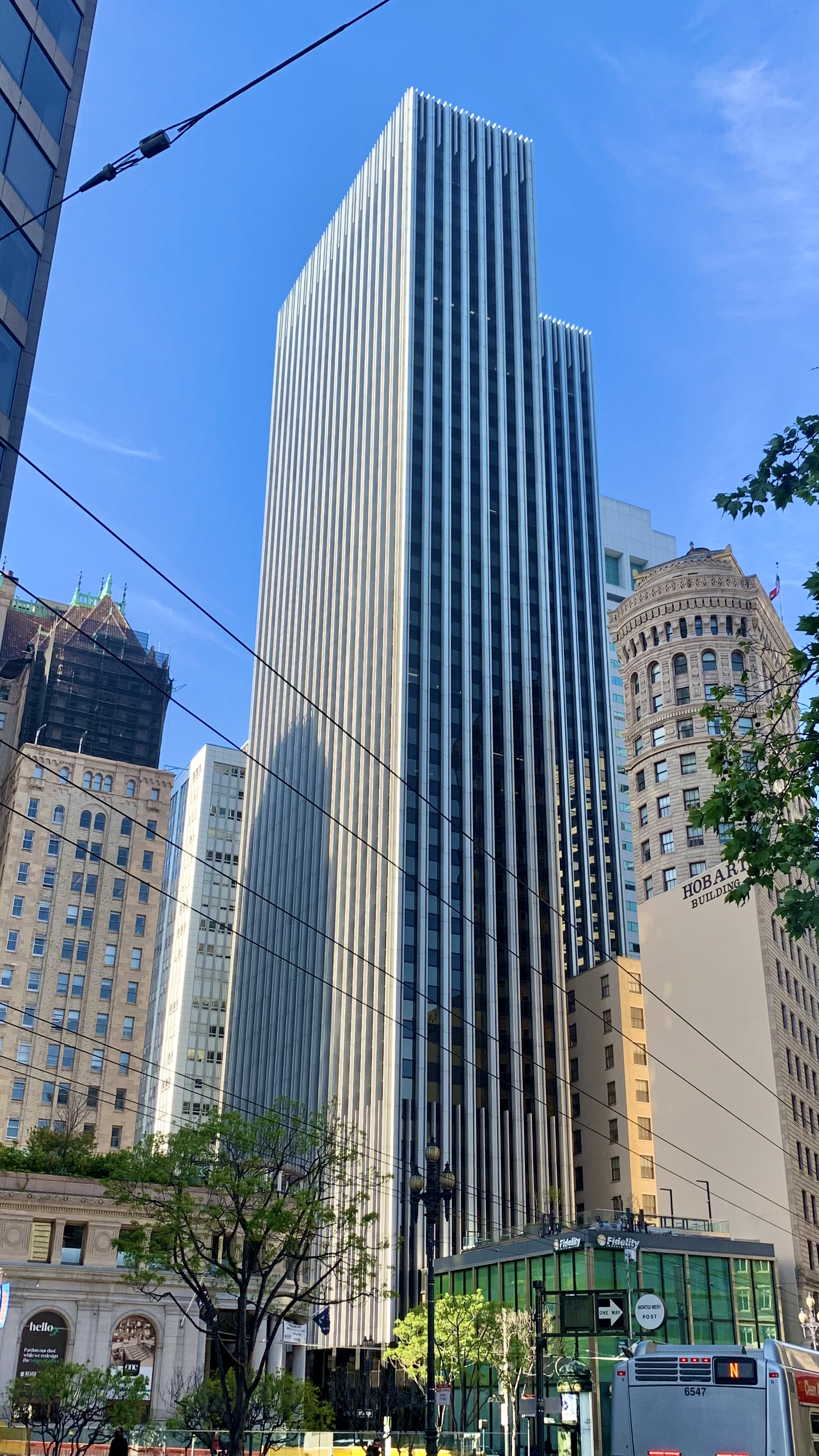
Building housing the French Consulate General in San Francisco

A visa allows a foreigner and non-European Union member, to enter and travel temporarily within French territory. On June 27, 2018, the Visas section of the French Consulate of San Francisco was replaced by the contractor VFS Global.

=== The Chancellery ===
The chancellery (open from Monday to Friday from 9:00 am to 12:30 pm) provides all of administrative services to French citizens abroad. The chancellery can support French citizens who have had their documents lost or stolen. It also serves for renewing passports, obtaining scholarships, grants, and other scholar financial aides. This service establishes itself as a direct interface between migrants and their nation of origin. The Chancellery regularly organizes consular missions within the jurisdiction to assist and support French citizens abroad.

=== Cultural services ===
The headquarters of Cultural Services of the French Embassy is based in New York. However, The Consulate General of France in San Francisco, like all 10 of the French Consulates in the United States, possess a cultural service department that satisfies the following missions:

- Encourage French cultural productions by helping professionals and artists in the United States,
- Promote the French educational system by managing the careers of French teachers, professors, and research workers in the United States, establishing guidance for students and parents, organizing national exams,
- Accompany students regarding to their university transfers,
- Inform students and professionals returning to France of procedures to follow, like producing the necessary contacts for their job,
- Support all possible efforts towards artistic events, cultural establishments, and higher education.

=== Scientific services ===
This service, shared by consulates of San Francisco and Los Angeles, is in charge of monitoring developments in science and technology, supports international scientific cooperation, and promotes French scientific and technological advances in the United States.

=== Press and communication services ===
This represents the direction of Communication and of "Porte-parolat" (DCP) of the Minister of European and Foreign Affairs. Its mission includes:

1. To inform the public and the press about France, its institutions and its foreign policy and to respond to demands and enquiries,
2. To inform the Minister of Foreign Affairs and through it, French authorities, about the primary political, economic and social events occurring within the jurisdiction,
3. To organize information for the French and foreign public through the web site of the Consulate General,
4. To establish and develop privileged contacts with the press within the circumscription, in order to present and explain France's position regarding foreign policy, (Attention: the Press service is not the "spokesman" of France)
5. To monitor the image projected of France in the local media and to correct, if needed, informational errors by using the right of reply.

== France abroad ==
=== The Consul General ===
Frederic Jung, 40, originally from the Alsace region of France. He is a graduate of the Institute of Political Studies in Strasbourg. He is married and the father of two little girls.

He joined the Ministry of Europe and Foreign Affairs in 2004.

The various positions he held in Paris and in the diplomatic field abroad led him to develop a particular interest in the United Nations and the European Union.

In Paris, he specifically dealt with disarmament and non-proliferation issues, and then negotiations at the UN Security Council regarding the Middle East. In New York, in 2009, he was an adviser-negotiator at the French Mission to the United Nations on African issues, before becoming the mission's spokesperson until 2014.

He then moved to Brussels to become the spokesperson for the Permanent Representation of France to the European Union, dealing in particular with the eurozone, migration and security issues at the European level. In May 2017, he joined Place Beauvau as a diplomatic advisor to the Minister of the Interior.

=== Honorary consuls ===
As a whole of the consular jurisdiction (nearly 4 million km^{2}), the honorary consuls relieves the actions of the Consulate within the states of the Northwest. Usually, they legalize certain administrative procedures and directly collaborating with the Consulate General. However, they can not provide passports, identification cards or create official registration (documents such as birth certificates, marriage licenses, or death certificates).

Current honorary Consuls:

1. Alaska - Mélanie Lucas-Conwell
2. California (Sacramento) - Catherine Bonnefoy
3. Guam - Céline San Nicolas
4. Hawaii - Guillaume Maman
5. Idaho - Hortense Everett
6. Montana - Laurence Markarian
7. Nevada - Rémi Jourdan
8. Oregon - Dominique Geulin
9. Utah - Anne Lair
10. Washington - Ariane Ogier
11. Wyoming - Séverine Murdoch

=== French presence ===
The Consulate General collaborates regularly with numerous French associations and organizations abroad.

== France in California ==
=== Early French history in the region ===
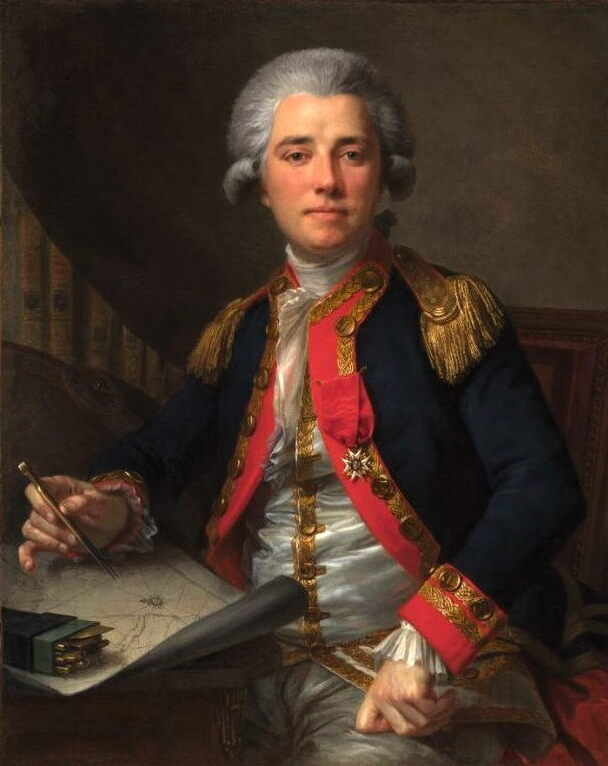
1778 portrait of the comte de Lapérouse

On September 15, 1786, a French Navy expedition under the comte de Lapérouse dropped anchor in Monterey Bay, marking the first official French presence in California. The expedition's members spent ten days collecting items of geographic and scientific interest from the region before departing, with Lapérouse writing of California's "enormous resources" and strategic position. In the 1840s, the French naturalist and botanist Eugène Duflot de Mofras was sent to the Pacific coast; he subsequently wrote a book about his visit in which de Mofras wrote of a vast region with a population of merely 4,000 people.

The American West Coast particularly interested King Louis Philippe I, who hoped to rebuild the French empire in North America that had been lost due to the Seven Years' War. On October 28, 1843, Louis Gasquet was appointed as the French consul in Monterey and arrived at the city in November to take up his position. During his tenure as consul, he pushed for his superiors in Paris to send the French Navy to annex California. However, in July 1846 American forces under Commodore John D. Sloat occupied Monterey. Gasquet refused to recognize the new American regime and was placed under house arrest.

Following an exchange of diplomatic letters, Gasquet was released from house arrest after 51 days, and replaced by Jacob Moerenhout in October 1846. Preserving the interests of his citizens and observing the turbulent behavior of his neighbors, Moernhout created a region favorable to French immigrants. He settled in the Consulate of Monterey, situated by the sea: " a spacious house with a beautiful rose garden and orchards".

=== The French community of San Francisco ===
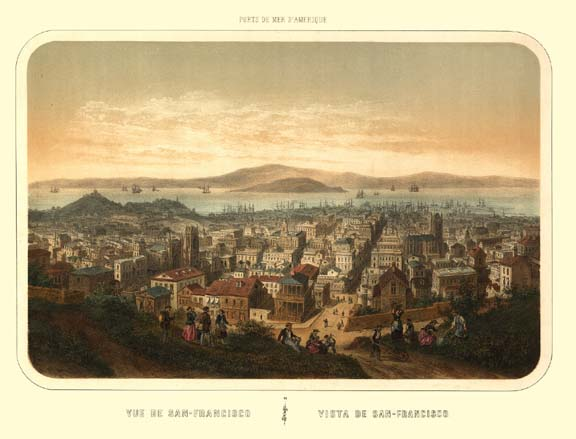
The city of San Francisco in 1860

When San Francisco was still called Yerba Buena ("the good herb"), only three French nationals were recorded among 800 inhabitants. However, the rapidly growing population (23,000 inhabitants in 1852) enticed the government of President Louis-Napoléon Bonaparte to establish the French Consulate in San Francisco, the new economic capital of the region. France already had a consular agent that exercised his duties until the arrival of the first Consul General, Mr. Patrice Dillion, on July 22, 1850. Unable to settle in a city still under construction, the Consul accepted the hospitality of a damp French ship on the bay. Sometime later, he decided to take residence on the corner of Jackson and Mason.

The position of Consul General of France in San Francisco was significant because it introduced the most important diplomatic representation in all of the Western United States. According to Jehanne Biétry-Sallinger, California consisted of 352,000 inhabitants, of which 28,000 were French, almost 8% of the total population. The principal mission of the consulate at the time was to provide emergency assistance to new immigrants. When they arrived in this faraway and unknown region, their first stop was the consulate, to receive information and money to settle and work in the mines. San Francisco was an unsafe city and brawls often broke out between French and foreign miners. The Consul had to quickly flee to the hinterlands to escape being hung by his fellow citizens, as in Placerville in 1853. Moreover, the Consul organized numerous public ceremonies in honor of events that affected France, such as the storming of Sebastopol in 1855.

This troubled period saw the development of a united and dynamic French community that grew each day as a result of boats shipping migrants bound for the "streets to gold". Most stayed and settled permanently: the erection of Notre-Dame-des-Victoires Catholic parish in 1856 is the most striking example. The church continues to celebrate Mass in French today. Gradually, the community organized and founded restaurants, laundries, and theaters near Bush and Mason Street; the French quarter thus developed rapidly.

=== The Consulate General of France in San Francisco ===
After 1892, the consular office moved to 604 Commercial Street, next to the port within the Financial District. Documents of the time disclosed an exact description of the Consulate of France: " the neighborhood is modest, its entry is abrupt, but it seems as though there are enough serious motifs which have unfortunately been often criticized by the French colony and French voyagers in passing, the Consulate will be preserved here where it is. Insufficient funds for rent were administered to the chief of staff who then had to pay the remaining sum from his own reserves(…) in addition, our Consul would have received the authorization to renew the antique furniture that remained. It is necessary to include that the great majority of foreign consulates should not have a better status. The budget does not always measure up to amount expected. "

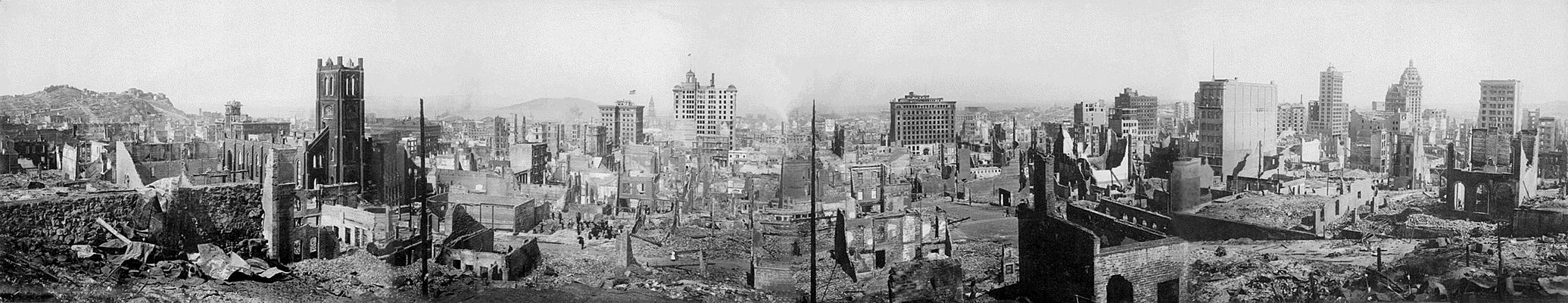
San Francisco after the earthquake (1906)

The earthquake of 1906 in San Francisco ruined most French investments and the consulate was completely destroyed. On April 20, 1906, a telegram addressed to the Quai d'Orsay reads, "The manager of our Consulate in San Francisco telegrams me with hopes to inform the Department that the Consulate is destroyed; the personnel is safe, the archives have stayed under the rubble. " Little France therefore lost all its influence in local life. After the earthquake, the consulate settled at the Union Trust Building. Following the Second World War, which witnessed the succession of two Consuls to the same post (one representing Vichy France, the other liberated France), the Consulate installed at 690 Market Street. After the war, the residence of the two Consulates would be closed and official receptions would be held just in front, in the Palace Hotel. By 1958, the Consulate moved to a more spacious location in a three-story building on the corner of Bush and Taylor. During the 1970s, the consulate acquired a very beautiful residence on Jackson Street (bought in 1967), in Pacific Heights. Sadly, the narrowness of the building and its poor location forced the Minister of Foreign Affairs to find a new local. It was after the construction of a modern building on 540 Bush Street (next to the church Notre-Dame-des-Victoires) that the Consulate installed in 1981.

In 2011 the consulate moved to the 6th floor of the modern office tower on 88 Kearny Street.

== Annexe ==
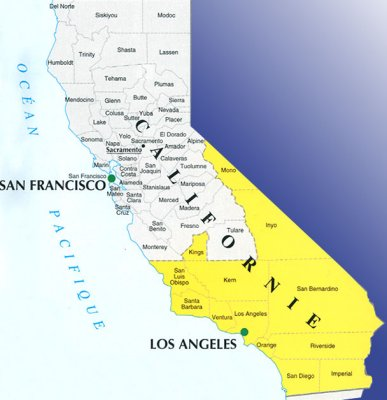
Counties of California under the jurisdiction of the Consulate General

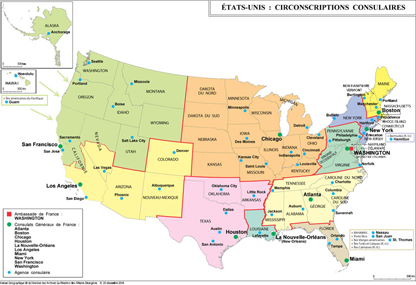
States of the North-West under the jurisdiction of the Consulate General

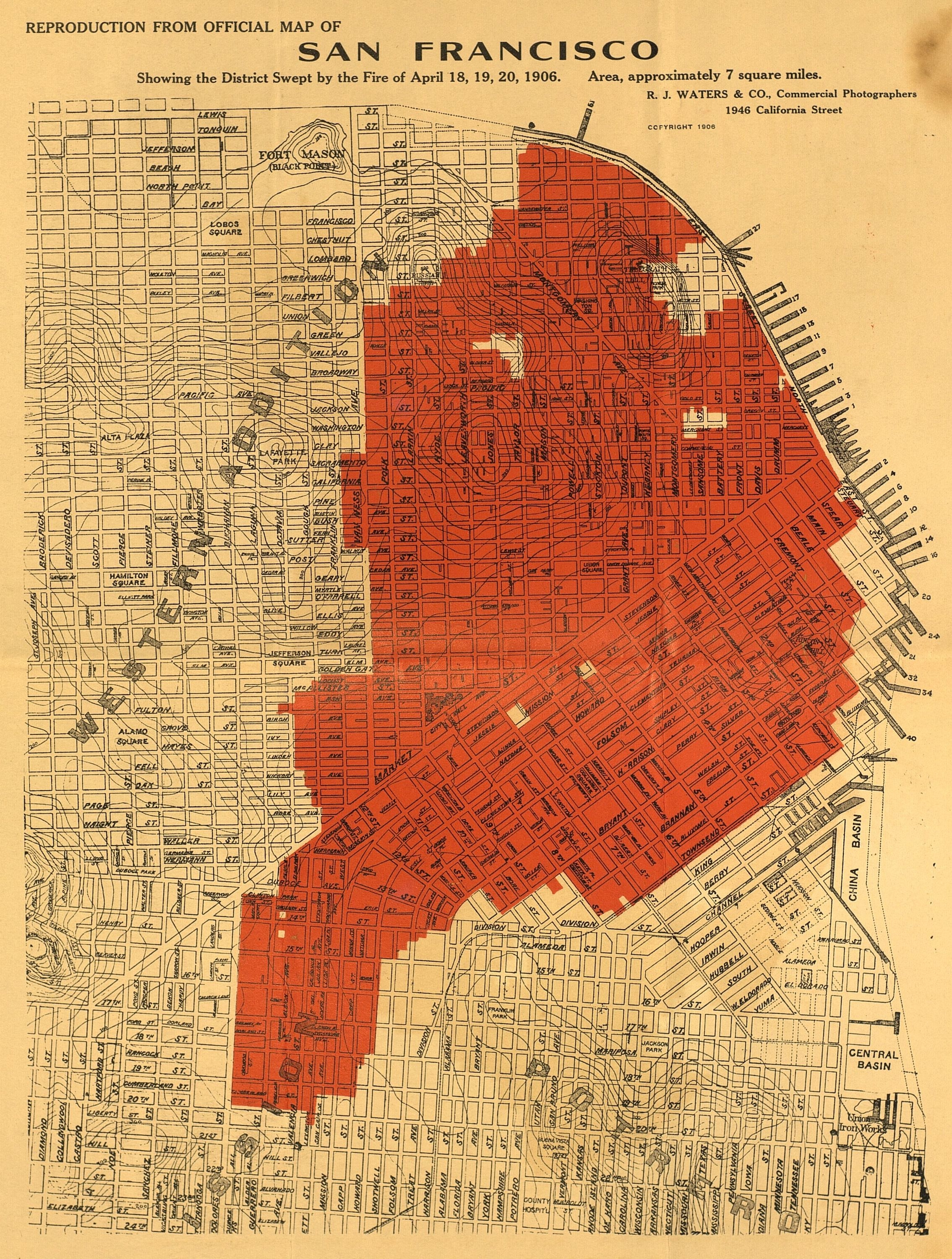
The earthquake of 1906 destroyed a large part of San Francisco, including the French Quarter

Consuls General in San Francisco
1843–1846	Louis GASQUET (in Monterey)
1846–1850	Jacob. A MOEHRENHOUT (in Monterey)
1850-19 December 1856	Patrice DILLON
1857-19 April 1861	Frédéric-Abel GAUTIER
1861-9 June 1863	Antoine FOREST
1863-1er Jan.1864	Frédéric-Abel GAUTIER
1864-18 Nov.1867	Charles de CAZOTTE
1867-16 Nov.1868	J. BELCOUR
1868-13 Feb.1869	Charles de CAZOTTE
1869-25 June.1869	J. BELCOUR
1869-26 Jul.1875	Édouard BREUIL
1875-11 Dec.1875	J. BELCOUR
1876-30 Oct.1877	Antoine FOREST
1877-31 Oct.1880	Consul, Antoine FOREST
1880-28 Oct.1884	Auguste VAUVERT de MEAN
1884–1891	Edmond CARREY
1891–1892	Gustave-Auguste DELONGRAYE
1892–1898	Alexandre LAURENCE DE LALANDE
1898	TRUY (never arrived)
1898–1901	Adolphe DENIS de TROBRIAND
1901–1903	Auguste-Henri DALLEMAGNE
1903–1907	Etienne-Marie-Louis LANEL
11 avril 1903	The Consulate became a Consulate General
1907–1912	Henri-Antoine MEROU
1912–1915	Raphaël MONNET
1915–1924	Hippolyte-Charles-Julien NELTNER
1924–1931	Maurice HEILMANN
1931–1937	Yves MERIC de BELLEFON
1937–1941	Roger GAUCHERON
1941–1942	Claude BREART de BOISANGER
November 1942	The Consulate General is closed.
1943–1945	Charles-Simon de LESSART
1945–1946	Jacques BAEYENS
1946–1948	Raoul BERTRAND
1949–1951	Jean VYAU de LAGARDE
1952–1955	Louis de Guiringaud
1956–1960	Robert LUC
1961–1966	Pierre BASDEVANT
1967–1971	Claude BATAULT
1972–1976	Emmanuel de CASTEJA
1977–1978	Pierre MATHIVET de la VILLE de MIRMONT
1979–1981	Pierre Brochand
1982–1985	Gérard ERRERA
1986–1990	Pierre VIAUX
1991–1994	Yves ROE d'ALBERT
1995–1996	Alain LE GOURRIEREC
1997–1999	André PARANT
2000–2002	Gérard Coste
2003–2007	Frédéric DESAGNEAUX
2007–2010	Pierre-François MOURIER
2010–2014	Romain SERMAN
2014–2016	Pauline CARMONA
2016–2020	Emmanuel LEBRUN-DAMIENS
2020–present	Frederic JUNG

== See also ==
- List of diplomatic missions of France
- Embassy of France, Washington, D.C.
- France–United States relations
- Alliance Française de San Francisco
- French American International School (San Francisco)
- Lycée Français de San Francisco
- 88 Kearny Street
- Education Française Bay Area
