= Science Diplomats Club =

- Formation: January 1965
- Type: Social club
- Location: Washington, D.C.
- Members: 130
- Official language: English
- Chair: Annick Suzor-Weiner

The Science Diplomats Club (SDC) is a social club that was founded in Washington, D.C. in 1965. The membership includes Science attachés, or representatives of research institutions from more than 40 Washington-based embassies, about half from Europe. In addition, a few former science attachés, as well as some U.S. personalities, have been granted the status of SDC honorary members.

== Mission ==
The principal purpose of SDC is:

"to provide an informal meeting place and networking channel for the Science Diplomats. Newcomers quickly find a group of colleagues with whom they can meet and 'learn the ropes' of the Washington science scene. Second, SDC offers a meeting forum where, on an almost monthly basis, we get together to receive briefings on central science and technology issues of the day. Such encounters are useful in that they provide highly relevant information and insights on central matters, through discussion sessions with people from one of the many think tanks in Washington, with representatives from NIH, NSF, AAAS, the National Academies, NOAA or NIST. Also, dialogues with representatives from universities or various federal departments on pertinent issues of clear international relevance and consequence. ... SDC is thus a useful and dynamic two-way information and communications forum, benefiting the members and those science, technology and higher education stakeholders in Greater Washington wishing to stay in touch with the international science community. We are open to new suggestions and ideas on how to become an even more attractive and internationally oriented knowledge-promoting networking instrument".

== History ==
The Science Diplomats Club was established during a lunch held by the Embassy of Denmark at the Cosmos Club in January 1965. The club was the initial site for luncheons; when the Embassy of the Netherlands took over the secretariat, luncheons were also held at their embassy and other local restaurants. Starting in 1988, various science counselors started hosting luncheons either at their embassies, Meridian House, scientific/technical organizations, and, later on again, at the Cosmos Club.

During these luncheons, guest speakers from the government, associations, universities, and industries informed SDC members about developments in science and technology policy and on progress in R&D. In recent years, the club has also made visits to S&T organizations inside and outside the Washington area. In 2007 the Embassy of France began organizing "Science Breakfasts", which take place eight to ten times a year.

Apart from attending monthly luncheons and site visits, members are also invited to attend meetings at scientific and technical institutions, such as the National Academy of Sciences, National Institute of Standards and Technology, etc.

The following persons have been chair of the SDC:

Dates	Chair	Embassy
Jan. 1965 – Jan. 1981	Louis Groven	Embassy of Belgium
Feb. 1981 – Dec. 1981	Herman van Vierssen	Embassy of the Netherlands
Jan. 1982 – Aug. 1984	John Gaunt	Embassy of the United Kingdom
Aug. 1984 – Dec. 1989	Cyril Hide	Embassy of South Africa
Dec. 1989 – Sept. 1992	Alastair Allcock	Embassy of the United Kingdom
Sept. 1992 – July 1994	Claude Wolff	Embassy of France
July 1994 – June 1997	Paul op den Brouw	Embassy of the Netherlands
June 1997 – June 1998	Donald L.P. Strange	Embassy of Canada
June 1998 – June 1999	Yoram Shapira	Embassy of Israel
June 1999 – Dec. 2001	Kees Planqué	Embassy of the Netherlands
Jan. 2002 – Dec. 2005	Jostein Mykletun	Embassy of Norway
Dec. 2005 – June 2010	Paul op den Brouw	Embassy of the Netherlands
June 2010 – present	Annick Suzor-Weiner	Embassy of France

== Activities ==
As a social club, the SDC organizes social activities (e.g. summer and winter parties). However, it also organizes meetings with American personalities in the domain of science and diplomacy, and encounters with US science advisers, international bodies, and think tanks. Nowadays, such meetings are organized on a more regular basis (the Science Breakfasts). The SDC also organizes external activities to visit science centers or technology parks, jointly with agencies or diplomacy-related associations, and participates in co-sponsoring events related to science diplomacy.

== Science Breakfasts ==
Since January 2007, together with the SDC, the Office of Science and Technology of the Embassy of France has organized monthly "Science Breakfasts", inviting a prominent member of the American science and technology community to speak to an audience of counselors from embassies in Washington. Since the first session, in January 2007, 30 to 40 guests from 15 to 20 different countries, have had to strengthen ties with American leaders in science and technology and ask them questions and spur dialog within a favorable context.

== See also ==
- List of diplomatic missions in Washington, D.C.
