= Consulate General of France, Atlanta =

Consulate General of France in Atlanta Consulat Général de France à Atlanta
- Location: 3399 Peachtree Rd NE, Suite 567, Atlanta GA 30326
- Coordinates: 33°45′18″N 84°23′24″W
- Consul General: Matthieu Clouvel Gervaiseau
- Website: us.diplomatie.gouv.fr/en/consulate-general-france-atlanta

The Consulate General of France in Atlanta is the French diplomatic outpost to the U.S Southeast. Its jurisdiction covers the states of Alabama, Georgia, Mississippi, North Carolina, South Carolina, and Tennessee. The mission of the Consulate is to provide protection and administrative services to French citizens living or traveling within the region. It also seeks to promote French-American cooperation and exchange. It is one of the ten consulates of the French diplomatic network in the United States.

== Services ==
- The Chancellery provides administrative services to French nationals including social aid, scholarships, help for French travelers in difficulty, assistance to incarcerated French citizens, etc. It serves as an intermediary between the French administration and French nationals, helping the latter to maintain ties and exercise their rights as citizens.
- The Office of Cultural Services facilitates cooperation and French-American dialogue in the U.S. Southeast in the educational, university and artistic fields. Alongside its partners, it supports numerous projects and initiatives in the arts, literature, cinema, the digital sphere, the French language and higher education.
- The Office for Science and Technology seeks to actively participate in the scientific and technological dynamism of the U.S. Southeast by identifying new possibilities for research partnerships between local public or private institutions and French organizations. Among its missions, the Office monitors local scientific innovations; initiates and reinforces scientific and technological partnerships; encourages exchanges of doctoral students and researchers between the two countries; and supports French and American innovation through accompanying young start-ups in their discovery of the U.S. ecosystem as well as through promoting the France’s attractiveness to young innovative American companies.
- The Press and Communications Office oversees the Consulate’s external communication. It is in charge of maintaining close relations with the local media and institutions, explaining the policies of the French Government in foreign and domestic affairs. The Office also manages the Consulate’s website, e-newsletter, and social media accounts.

== Location ==
Previously located in the Prominence in Buckhead building, the Consulate General of France in Atlanta moved to the 5th floor of Buckhead Towers at Lenox Square in Buckhead on May 17, 2010. The building can be found at the intersection of Lenox Road and E. Paces Ferry Road NE, behind Lenox Mall and adjacent to the J.W. Marriott Hotel.

The space was inaugurated on June 30, 2010 as the "Maison de France" complex. At that time, it also included the French-American Chamber of Commerce of Atlanta, the French Trade Commission-Ubifrance, and the Atlanta-Accueil association. As of summer 2021, the space is exclusively occupied by the Consulate.

== Past and present Consuls General ==
Since the opening of the consulate in 1989, eleven French diplomats have served as consuls general of France in Atlanta :

| Nom | Dates |
|---|---|
| Jacky Musnier | 1989-1993 |
| Gérard Blanchot | 1993-1997 |
| Jean-Paul Moncheau | 1997-2001 |
| René-Serge Marty | 2001-2005 |
| Philippe Ardanaz | 2005-2009 |
| Pascal Le Deunff | 2009-2012 |
| Denis Barbet | 2012-2016 |
| Louis de Corail | 2016-2019 |
| Vincent Hommeril | 2019-2022 |
| Anne-Laure Desjonquères | 2022-2026 |
| Matthieu Clouvel Gervaiseau | 2026- |

Source : consulate general of France in Atlanta

== France-Atlanta ==
In 2010, the Consulate and the Georgia Institute of Technology launched France-Atlanta, with the purpose of breathing new life into the French-American relationship in the U.S. Southeast. The inaugural edition featured 20 events attended by over 3,500 participants, including delegations from Paris and Metz, France.

Since then, the initiative has transformed into an annual, multidisciplinary affair featuring French and American business leaders, scientists, artists, and humanitarian experts. Through its programming, it seeks to showcase the best ideas and innovations on both sides of the Atlantic as well as to encourage partnerships between French and American scholars, artists and visionaries.

== Honorary Consuls ==
The consul general supervises and works closely with eight honorary consuls based in the following locations within the consulate’s jurisdiction:

- Mobile (Alabama)
- Savannah (Georgia)
- Hattiesburg (Mississippi)
- Charlotte (North Carolina)
- Raleigh (North Carolina)
- Charleston (South Carolina)
- Greenville (South Carolina)
- Nashville (Tennessee)

== See also ==
- Embassy of France in Washington, D.C.
- Franco-American relations
