= Lycée Français de San Francisco =

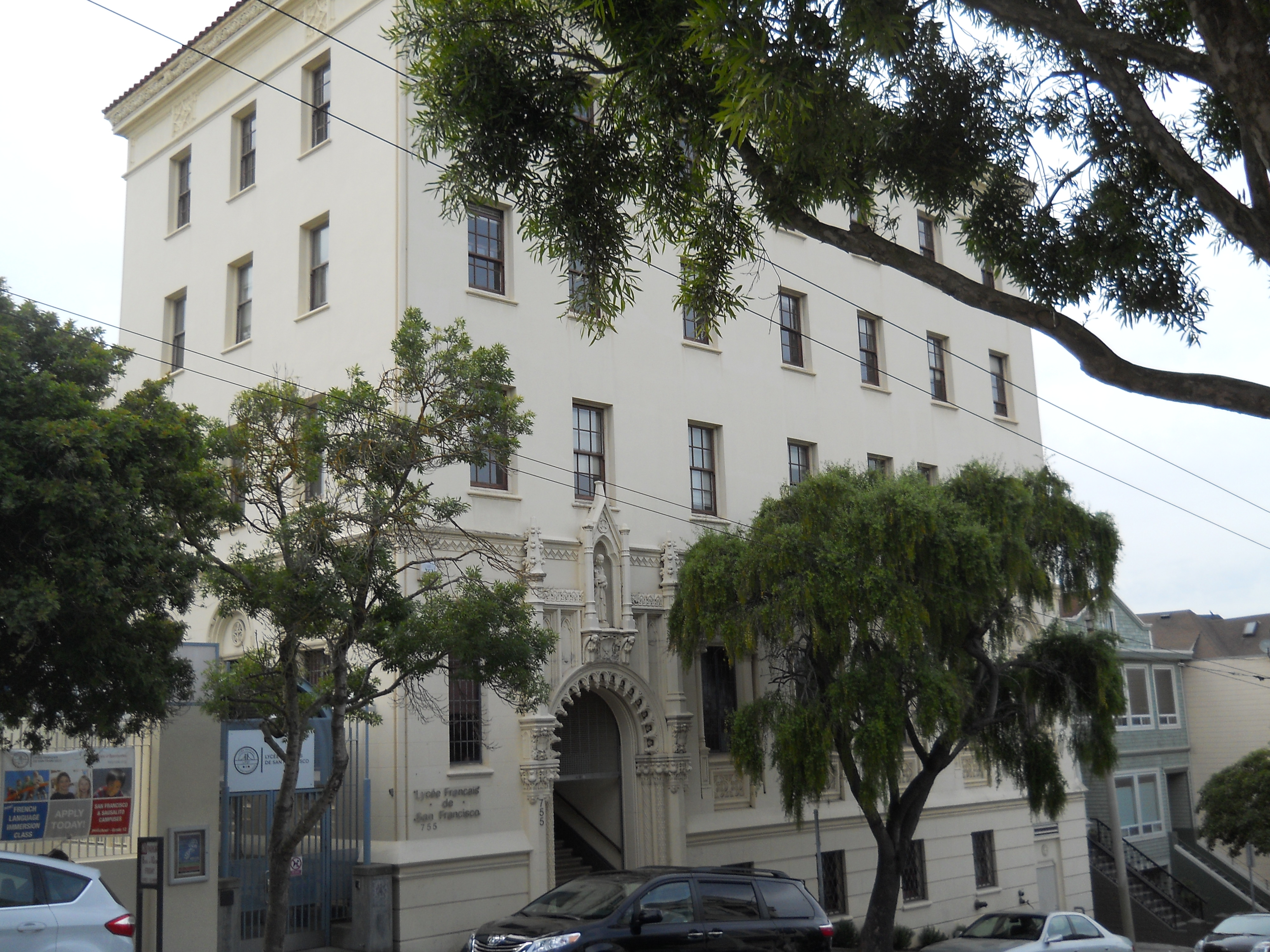
- Lycée Français de San Francisco main campus, Ashbury Street
- Ortega Campus, 1201 Ortega Street, San Francisco, CA 94112; Cole Campus: 755 Ashbury Street, San Francisco, CA 94117; Sausalito Campus: 610 Coloma Street, Sausalito, CA 94965; San Francisco, CA; Sausalito, CA; United States

Information
- Type: Private
- Established: 1967
- Proviseur: Emmanuel Texier
- Website: http://www.lelycee.org

The Lycée Français de San Francisco, previously known as the Lycée Français La Pérouse, is a private school in the San Francisco Bay Area. It welcomes students from preschool through middle, and high school grades. It has a primary campus and a secondary campus in San Francisco and a primary campus in Sausalito in Marin County.

Accredited by the French Ministry of Education and based on the French national curriculum, the school offers both a traditional French Track and an International Track. The International Track follows the International Baccalaureate (IB) program in Middle and High School, providing a student-centered curriculum focused on critical thinking and global citizenship. The International Track is open to students of all linguistic backgrounds, with no prior French required for admission.

The school prepares students to graduate with both their French Baccalauréat and the American High School diploma.

== History ==
The school was founded in 1967 by Claude Lambert and Claude Reboul as Lycée Français la Pérouse and was originally a satellite campus of the French American International School. The French School of Marin merged with the LFSF in 1986.

== Campuses ==
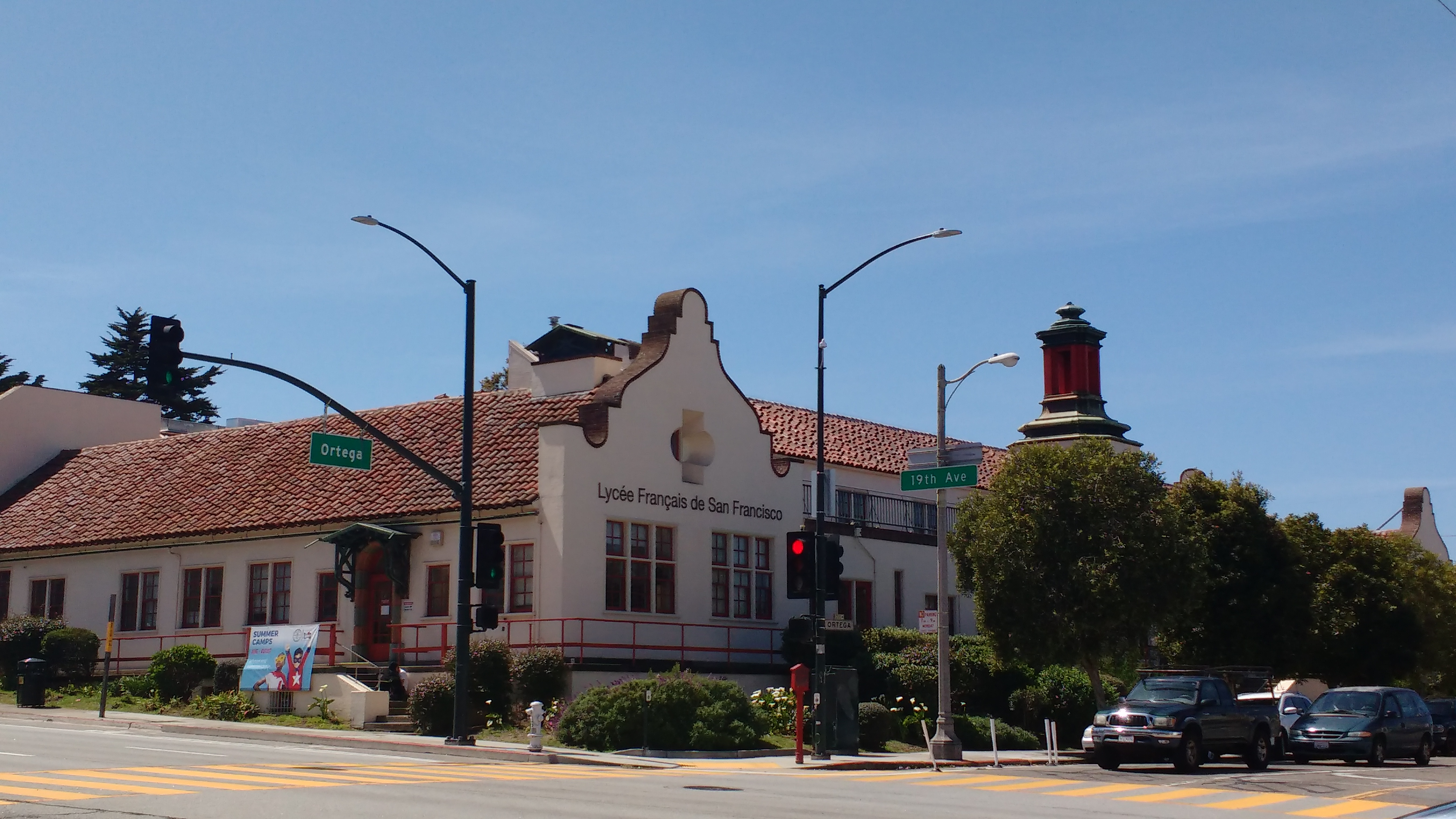
Ortega Campus building

- Ashbury Campus: Preschool–Grade 5
- Ortega Campus: Grades 6–12 This campus offers the French bac with the International option of the exam, an honor course of the baccalaureate.
- Sausalito Campus (formerly Marin County French School): Preschool–Grade 5 also includes La Petite Ecole (part-time program for children age 2+) and the FLI program for a gentle integration after Grade 1.
Campuses in San Francisco
Campuses in the Bay Area

== See also ==
- Agence pour l'enseignement français à l'étranger
- Education in France
- French Consulate General, San Francisco
- American School of Paris - An American international school in France
