= Embassy of France, Washington, D.C. =

Diplomatic mission to the United States

French Embassy, Washington, D.C. Ambassade de France à Washington
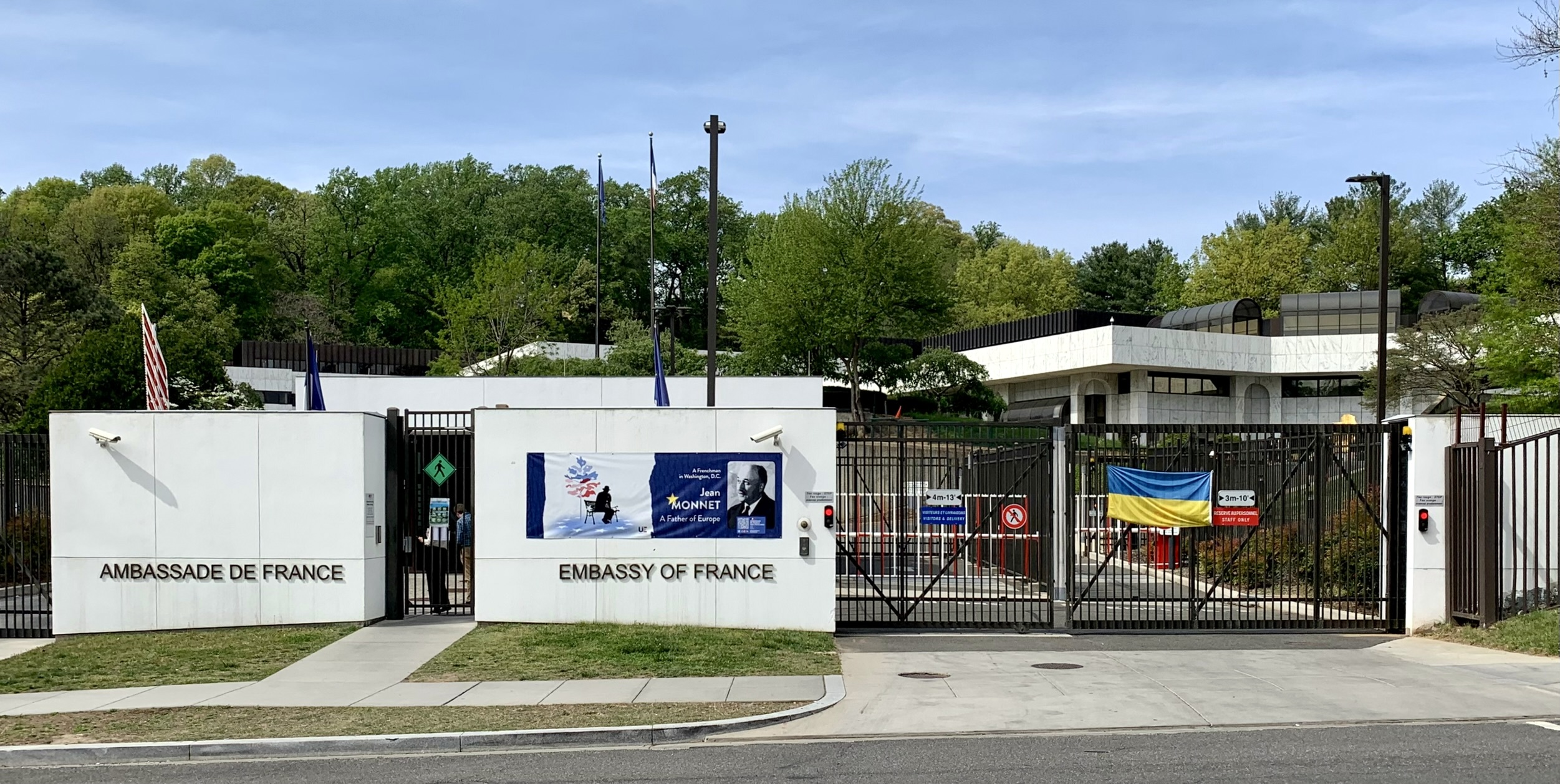
- French Embassy in 2022
- Location: Washington, D.C.
- Address: 4101 Reservoir Road, N.W.
- Coordinates: 38°54′49.27″N 77°4′40.63″W
- Ambassador: Aurélien Lechevallier

The Embassy of France in Washington, D.C., is the diplomatic mission of France to the United States.

It is located at 4101 Reservoir Road NW, Washington, D.C., just north of Georgetown University. It is accessed by the Rosslyn station on the Washington Metro. The embassy opened in 1984. With some 400 staffers, it is France's largest foreign embassy. The embassy represents the interests of France and French citizens in the United States and conducts the majority of diplomatic work on such interests within the U.S.

The embassy is headed by the French Ambassador to the United States, currently Laurent Bili. In addition to the standard diplomatic facilities, the compound includes La Maison Française, a cultural facility consisting of an auditorium, ballroom, and exhibition hall. Like many embassies, it regularly hosts events for the general public including music recitals (e.g. Baroque, classical, jazz, contemporary, pop and alternative music), films, dance, exhibitions, lectures and theatre.

== History ==
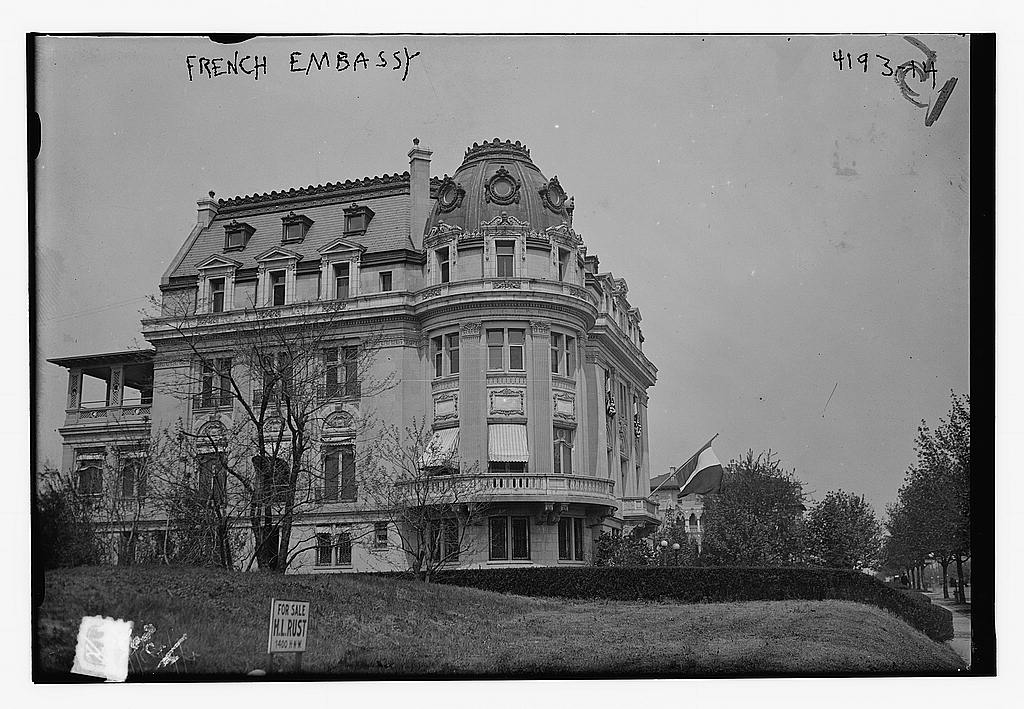
Old French Embassy in Washington, D.C., in 1917

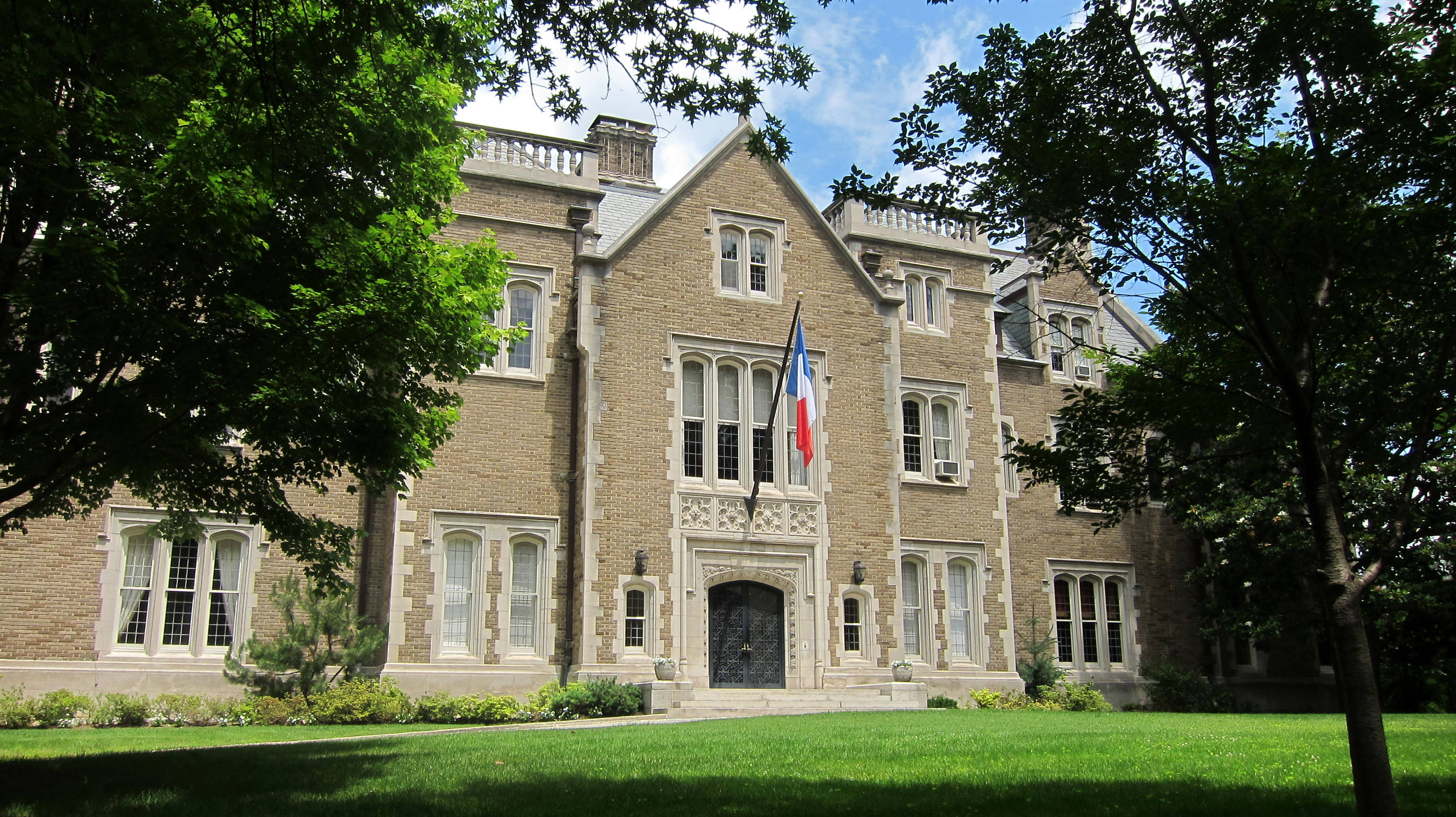
French ambassador's residence

In the 19th century, like most other embassies in Washington, D.C., the French rented houses (such as the corner house of the Seven Buildings from 1804 to 1811), and did not settle for a durable location. Its first permanent address was in the Beaux-Arts mansion at the corner of 16th Street and Kalorama Road NW, across the street from Meridian Hill Park, which is still extant and is now owned by the AK Party Representation to the United States, the U.S. government relations arm of the governing political party in Turkey. Mary Foote Henderson, a wealthy individual who lived nearby and had the ambition to develop the neighborhood as Washington's most upscale location, commissioned the building from architect George Oakley Totten Jr. for use by the French embassy in coordination with ambassador Jules Jusserand, who moved there upon building completion in 1907. The French state paid the rent to Henderson, then to her estate after she died in 1931.

In 1936, the embassy purchased a larger property at 2221 Kalorama Road NW, a 1910 Tudor Revival building in the then-prestigious Kalorama neighborhood, originally designed by the French-born American architect Jules Henri de Sibour for businessman William Watson Lawrence.

By the early 1970s, the administrative roles of the embassy had expanded far beyond what they had been in the interwar era, and its services were scattered in buildings throughout Washington, D.C. In 1973, the French government decided to build a new facility and purchased an eight-acre property next to Glover-Archbold Park. In 1975, government architect André Remondet won the design competition; construction works started in 1982 and was completed in late 1984.

In February 2015, the Kalorama residence reopened after undergoing a $4.5 million renovation. The home features art, mostly by French artists such as Pierre Bonnard, but also by non-French artists such as Igor Mitoraj. The property at one point encompassed 3.6 acres, but in 2017 the French government put an empty tract of 0.58 acres of the property up for sale.

== Services ==
The embassy operates several services and offices, responsible for different areas of policy and for liaising with relevant American bodies. The most notable of the services are listed below.

=== Chancery ===
The Chancery is the main diplomatic and political body. It is responsible for coordination with the American government on matters that affect France, particularly foreign policy. However, diplomacy is primarily conducted by the ambassador, leaving the chancery to liaise with the French government and coordinate with the Press Service in matters of public policy. The diplomats of the chancery take responsibility for a specific policy area and may stand in for the ambassador in his absence. The Chancery has attachés based in each of the ten regional consulates.

=== Press and Communications Office ===
The Press Service is responsible for the publication of the embassy's newsletter and magazine, as well as coordinating press releases and conferences, including the provision of designated spokesmen. The office also monitors American press coverage on issues pertaining to France and reports back to the ambassador and to Paris.

=== Offices of the Defence and Armament Attachés ===
These offices promote cooperation between the two countries on military and defense matters. The primary responsibility of the former is to facilitate liaison between the two government departments and the two nations' militaries, while latter oversees cooperation on matters of armaments and has responsibility for arms spending in the US as well as working with the US to develop new military technology. Both offices have a role to play in keeping the ambassador abreast of current defence issues and advising the Pentagon on French defence policy.

=== Cultural Service ===
The Cultural Services of the embassy is located at 972 Fifth Avenue in Manhattan, New York City. Its responsibility is to facilitate "cultural exchange" between the two nations, a role that can be creative, informative or merely administrative. The duties of the service include promoting French creative works in cultural and academic institutions from across France, with the help of the attachés in regional consulates.

=== Office of Science and Technology ===
The Office of Science and Technology (OS&T) is tasked with:

- promoting French science and technology with US actors, and with science expats, by organizing events and publishing local or topical newsletters;
- outreach activities to US academia and federal research bodies, with other European science advisors, and through an active presence in the Science Diplomats Club through "Science Breakfasts" organized since 2005, chairing the Club since 2010;
- watching and reporting on scientific breakthroughs, investments and innovations in key fields, by networking with academia, R&D agencies, non-governmental organizations, Congress, think tanks, etc.;
- building and sustaining scientific partnerships by organizing expert visits, seminars, and promoting annual calls of the French-US joint endowments and funds;
- fostering doctoral mobility of students and researchers, in particular with its flagship Chateaubriand program (see below).

OS&T is an active, reactive and proactive observer of scientific activity, technological innovations and their impact on the US society and beyond. OS&T is headquartered at the Washington, D.C. embassy and has teams at the French consulates of Atlanta, Boston, Chicago, Houston, Los Angeles, and San Francisco. OS&T collaborates with French research agencies, universities, engineering schools, and competitiveness clusters.

==== Chateaubriand Program ====
The Chateaubriand Fellowship Program, run by the Embassy of France, offers scholarships for US students to study in France. Founded in 1981, the fellowship has provided semester- and year-long support to over 750 students in the humanities, social sciences, natural sciences, and technology. The acceptance rate for the fellowship is between 6 and 8 percent annually.

The program, which aims to promote French-US cooperation, is run by the Office for Science & Technology and the Cultural Services division.

=== Office for Economic and Commercial Affairs ===
This is the office primarily concerned with maintaining and developing new trade links between the countries. For example, it assists French businesses trying to establish themselves in the US and vice versa. It also helps large and small French businesses which have long since established themselves in the American market, providing support and advice on economic and trade policies, both within the US and in France.

=== French Treasury Office ===
This office represents the French Treasury in the United States and Canada. It works in close partnership with the Federal Reserve, the Department of the Treasury and French and American financial institutions. Its role is to develop French economic policy in conjunction with the aforementioned bodies and to explain the policies to the United States. It has two offices, one in the embassy and a second in New York, from where it can work with Wall Street in order to better develop monetary policy.

== Consulates ==
The ambassador is also ultimately responsible for the 10 regional consulates:

1. Consulate General of France in Atlanta, responsible for Alabama, North Carolina, South Carolina, Georgia, Mississippi, and Tennessee
2. Consulate General of France in Boston, responsible for Massachusetts, Maine, New Hampshire, Rhode Island, and Vermont
3. Consulate General of France in Chicago responsible for Illinois, Indiana, Iowa, Kansas, Kentucky, Michigan, Minnesota, Missouri, Nebraska, North Dakota, South Dakota, Ohio, Wisconsin.
4. Consulate General of France in Houston, responsible for Texas, Oklahoma and Arkansas
5. Consulate General of France in Los Angeles, responsible for Arizona, Colorado, New Mexico, Southern California, and Southern Nevada
6. Consulate General of France in Miami, responsible for Florida, Puerto Rico, the Bahamas, the U.S. Virgin Islands, Cayman Islands, and Turks and Caicos Islands
7. Consulate General of France in New Orleans, responsible for Louisiana
8. Consulate General of France in New York, responsible for New York, New Jersey, Connecticut, and Bermuda
9. Consulate General of France in San Francisco, responsible for Northern California, Northern Nevada, Alaska, Hawaii, Idaho, Montana, Oregon, Utah, Washington, Wyoming, and Guam.
10. Consulate General of France in Washington, responsible for the District of Columbia and states of Maryland, Virginia, West Virginia, Delaware and Pennsylvania.

== Controversy ==
In 2006, a judge ruled that an employee of the Cultural Service of the French Embassy had been illegitimately fired for being pregnant and Muslim. "This may be the only time a U.S. court has extended the reach of the civil rights laws to extend to a foreign citizen, working for a foreign government on foreign soil at an embassy here in D.C." said Ari Wilkenfeld for NBC Washington.

== See also ==
- List of diplomatic missions of France
- Alliance française
- France – United States relations
- Embassy of the United States, Paris
