= Belden Place =

- Neighborhood of San Francisco
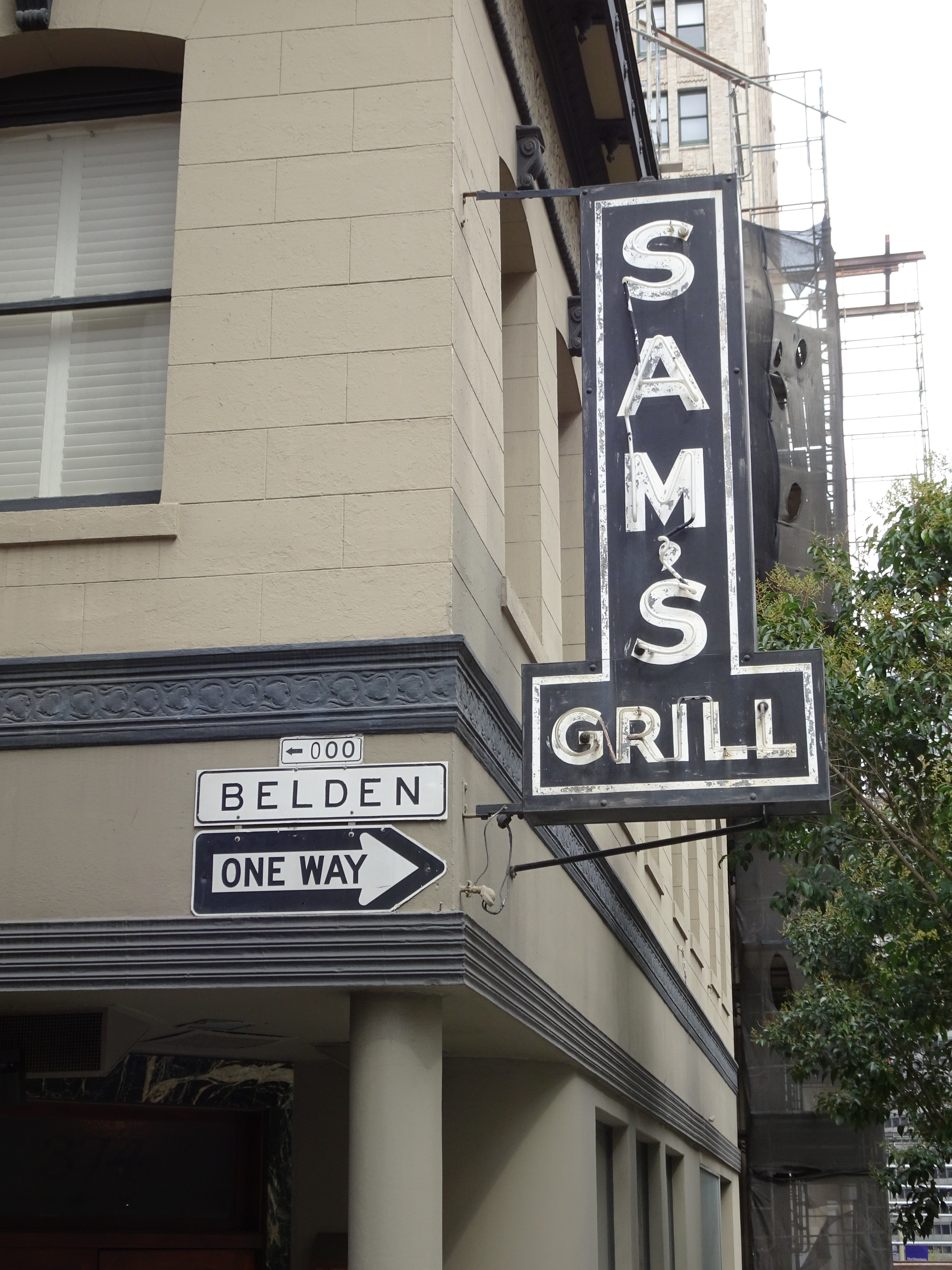

- Location within Central San Francisco
- Coordinates: 37.79125°N 122.40376°W
- Country: United States
- State: California
- City: San Francisco

Belden Place is a narrow alley in the Financial District of San Francisco, California that serves as the hub of the city's small French American community.

== Location ==
Locally the street is sometimes called Belden Lane, Belden Alley, or Belden Street. The surrounding neighborhood, which includes adjacent alleys and several blocks of Bush Street, is sometimes, though not universally, referred to as San Francisco's French Quarter for its historic ties to early French immigrants, and its popular contemporary French restaurants and institutions.

== History ==
The alley is named after Josiah Belden, an early California pioneer, San Jose's first mayor, and real estate businessman. Belden owned a portion "of the block on the east side of Kearny Street, between Bush and Pine running through to Belden Place. He built the Harpending block on the south side of Market Street, above first and the Belden block on the southwest corner of Montgomery and Bush Streets.

Later, Belden sold much of the Market Street property to Charles Crocker. The area was home to San Francisco's first French settlers. Approximately 3,000, sponsored by the French government, arrived near the end of the Gold Rush in 1851. According to historian Gladys Hansen, the French shared Dupont Street (now Grant Avenue) with early Chinese settlers during the early days of Chinatown, and were more sympathetic than others to their concerns. French novelist Alexandre Dumas, père, in his 1852 first-person account A Gil Blas in California, describes local Chinese cooks experimenting with French cuisine. The enclave persisted, despite subsequent waves of Chinese, Italian, Irish, and other immigrants to the area.

== Attractions and characteristics ==
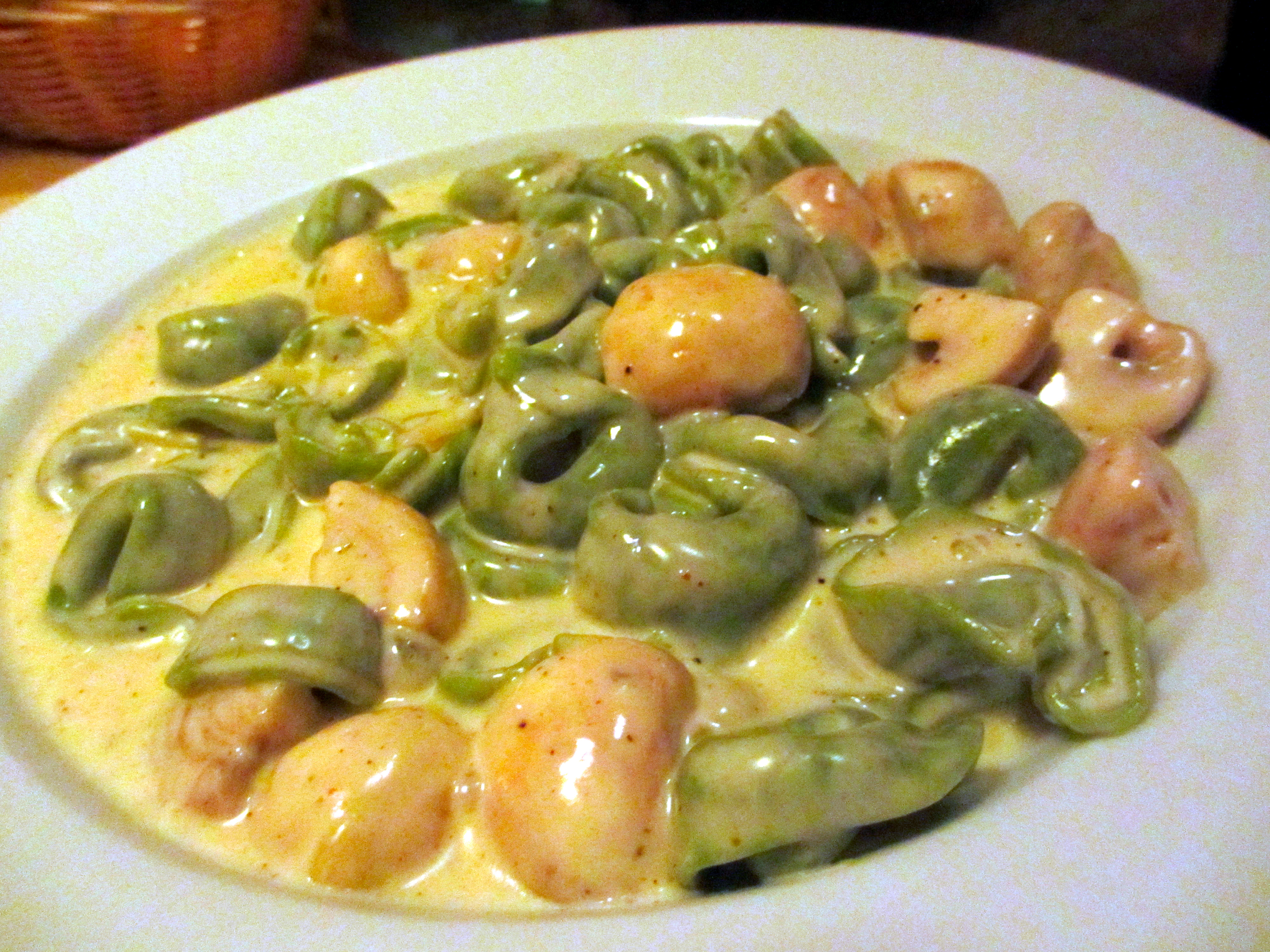
A pasta dish on Belden Place

Belden Place itself is a one-lane, one block long street running south from Pine Street to Bush Street, parallel to and in between Montgomery and Kearny streets, immediately south of the Bank of America tower. It is roughly between Chinatown and the Financial District.

In 1990, restaurateurs Olivier Azancot and Eric Klein opened Cafe Bastille, the mainstay that set the modern tone for the area. The French, Italian, and Catalan establishments are popular with locals, tourists, and office workers, and are generally considered on par with the city's best casual full-service European restaurants. Notable restaurants in the alley itself include Sam's Grill, Cafe Bastille, Cafe Tiramisu, Plouf, B44, Belden Taverna, and Brindisi Cucina di Mare. Nearby are Café de la Presse (though modest and unassuming, a favorite hangout of the city's political and social elite) and Le Central. Also nearby are the Alliance Française, the French consulate, and the Notre-Dame-des-Victoires Church (where mass is still celebrated in French) and an affiliated elementary school. In the vicinity are several other restaurants, cafes, hotels and other French-related institutions along Bush Street and Claude Lane, another nearby alley.

The cafes, hotels and restaurants of the area have a distinct joie de vivre befitting the neighborhood's heritage. Due to cold weather and lack of available locations, no other neighborhood in San Francisco has a comparable street dining scene. The lane is closed to vehicular traffic and filled for lunch and dinner with portable chairs, tables, umbrellas, and outdoor heaters. At night the lively street is lit with candles, Christmas lights strung overhead, and light spilling out from the restaurant interiors. Restaurants send attractive hostesses out into the street to lure potential diners. Every year, the area is the site of a boisterous Bastille Day celebration, the nation's largest, and Bush Street is temporarily renamed Buisson.
