= Education Française Bay Area =

French-language non-profit

Education Française Bay Area or EFBA (French Education Bay Area) is a French-language non-profit dedicated to promoting a bilingual French education in the San Francisco Bay Area. The organization is modeled after a similar non-profit in New York, EFNY. EFBA was founded in 2009. Upon the arrival of COVID-19, EFBA's program was transitioned to being web-based.
