= Notre-Dame-des-Victoires, San Francisco =

Church building in the United States

Notre-Dame-des-Victoires
- Église Notre Dame Des Victoires
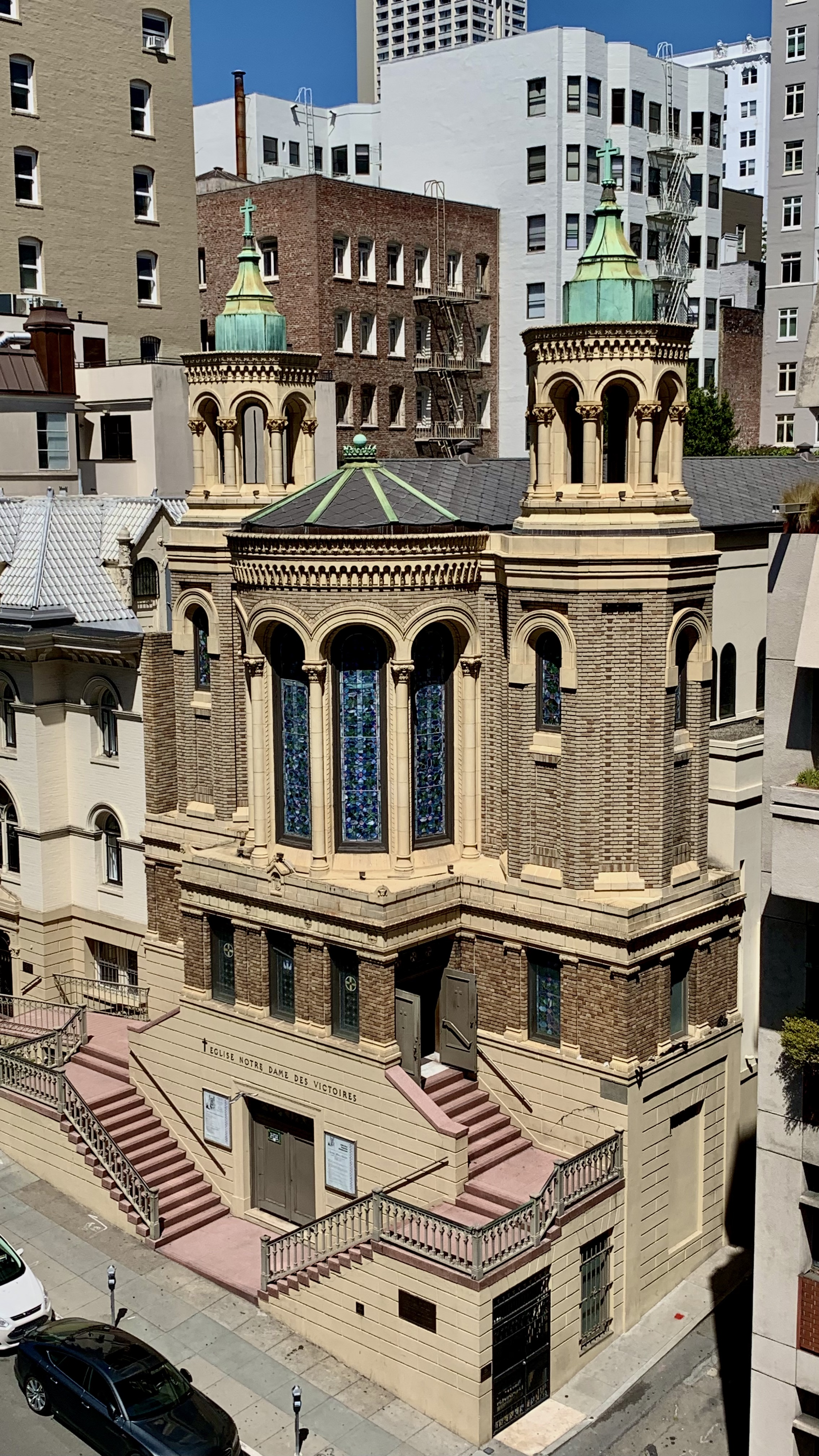
- In May 2021

- Location in San Francisco Notre-Dame-des-Victoires, San Francisco (California) Notre-Dame-des-Victoires, San Francisco (the United States)

Religion
- Affiliation: Roman Catholic

Location
- Location: 566 Bush St, San Francisco, California
- Country: United States
- Coordinates: 37.7907°N 122.4065°W

Architecture
- Founder: 1856
- San Francisco Designated Landmark
- Designated: 1981
- Reference no.: 173

Église Notre Dame Des Victoires is a Catholic church in San Francisco, California. The church was founded in 1856 to serve the French Catholic immigrants during the California gold rush. The architectural model for the church is the Basilique Notre-Dame de Fourvière in Lyon, France. In 1887, Pope Leo XIII signed the decree placing Eglise Notre Dame des Victoires under the charge of the Marists and giving it the designation of being a French National Church. In 2025, Archbishop Salvatore Cordileone appointed Rev. Gregory Heidenblut as the parish's first Augustinian pastor.

The church building was rededicated in 1915 after rising from the ashes of the 1906 earthquake and great fire, the same year its Johnston pipe organ (Opus 148) was installed, one of the notable surviving organs of early twentieth-century San Francisco. In 1984, it was designated as a historical landmark. After the 1989 earthquake, the building including the rectory, underwent a retrofit in record time. The organ and its 63 stained glass windows remain part of ongoing preservations today.

The church remains an important part of San Francisco's French community, and is located adjacent to the city's "French Quarter" centered on Belden Place. It's parish is a diverse, cross-cultural, cross-generational, and international community that celebrates Sunday mass in English and French.

== École Notre-Dame-des-Victoires ==
École Notre Dame des Victoires is a co-ed Catholic School, Kindergarten through Eighth Grade.

== Alumni of École Notre-Dame-des-Victoires ==
- Al Madrigal
- Gavin Newsom

== Images ==
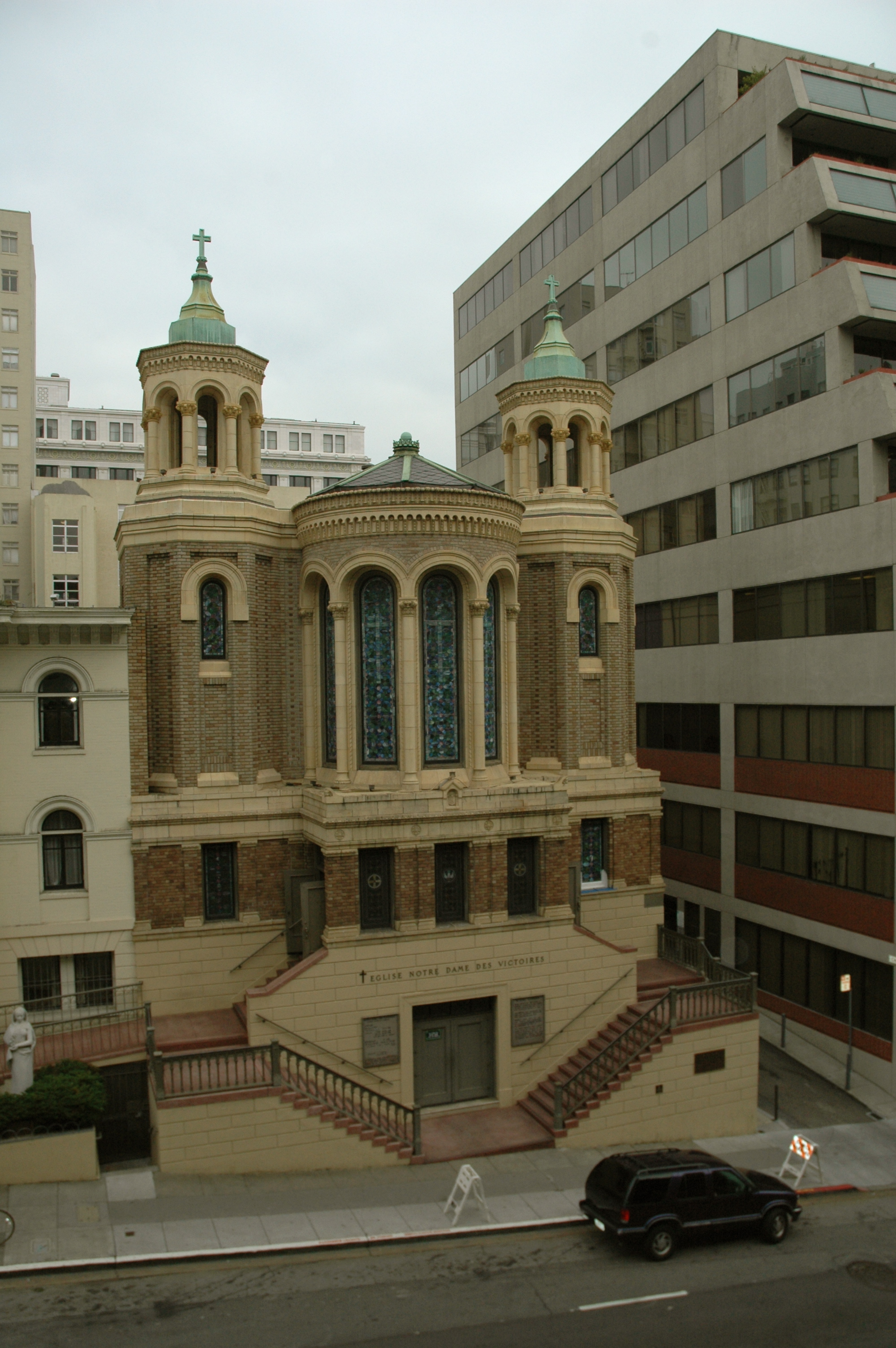
Front on view

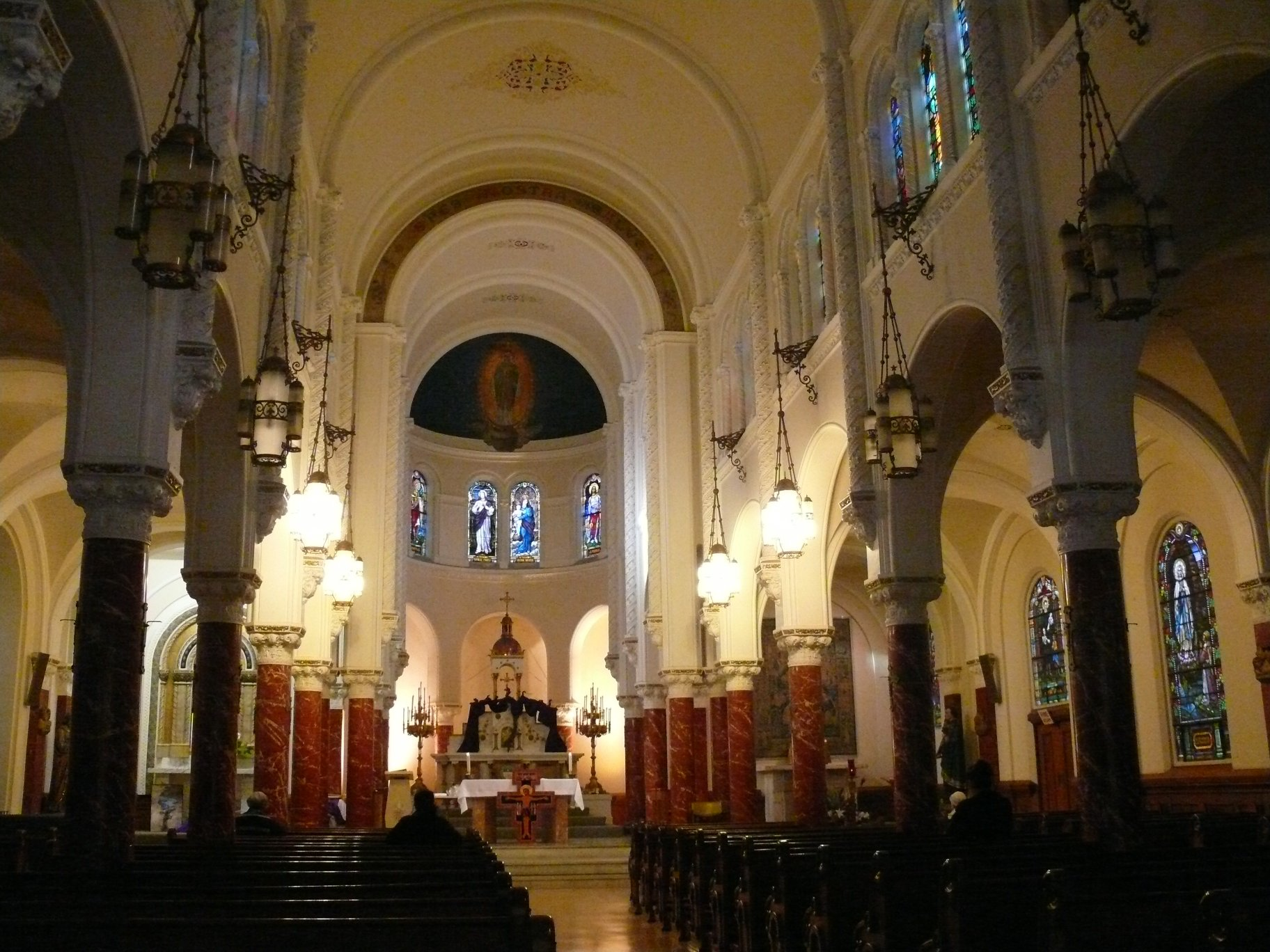
The nave

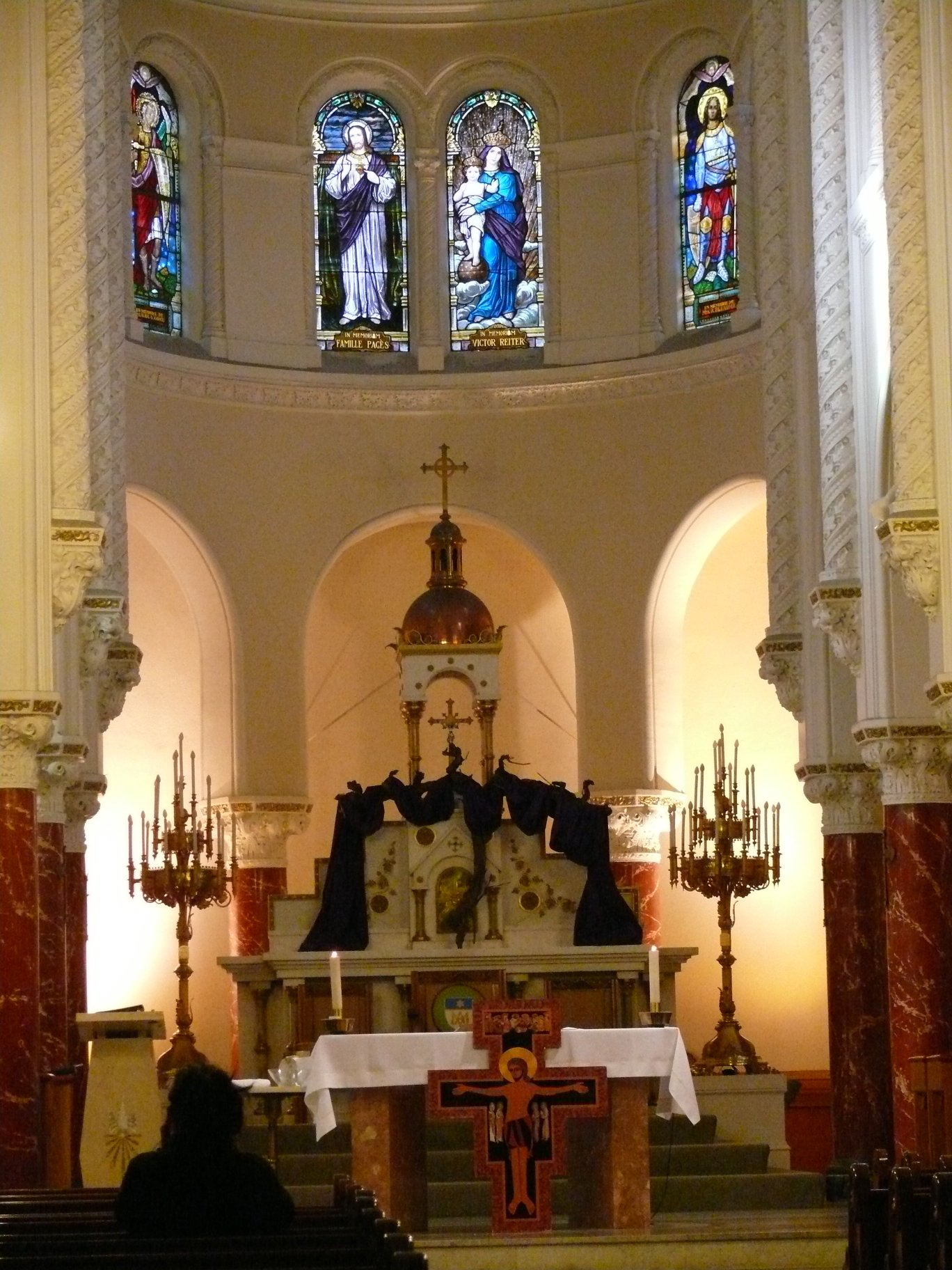
The choir

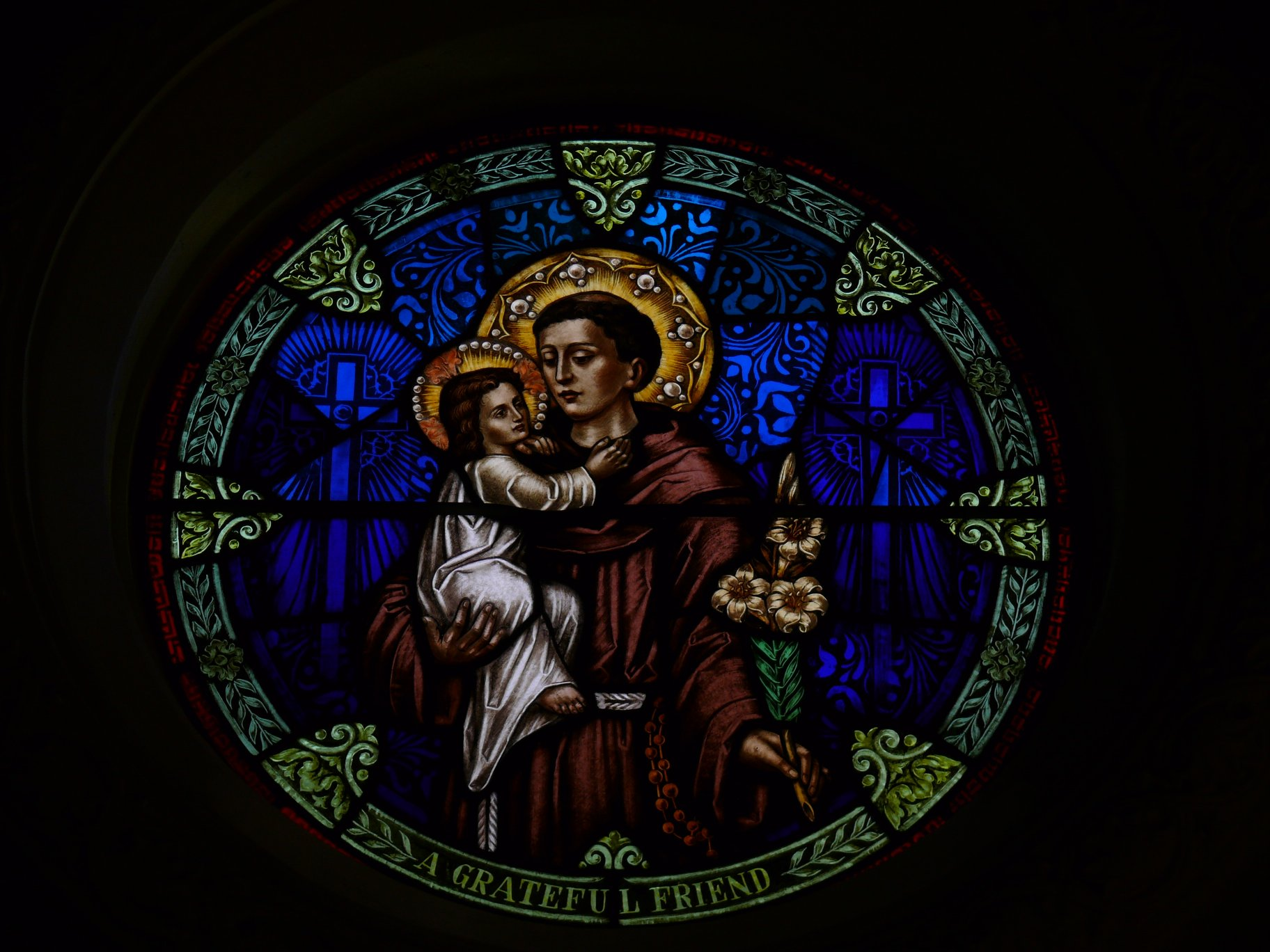
Stained glass window

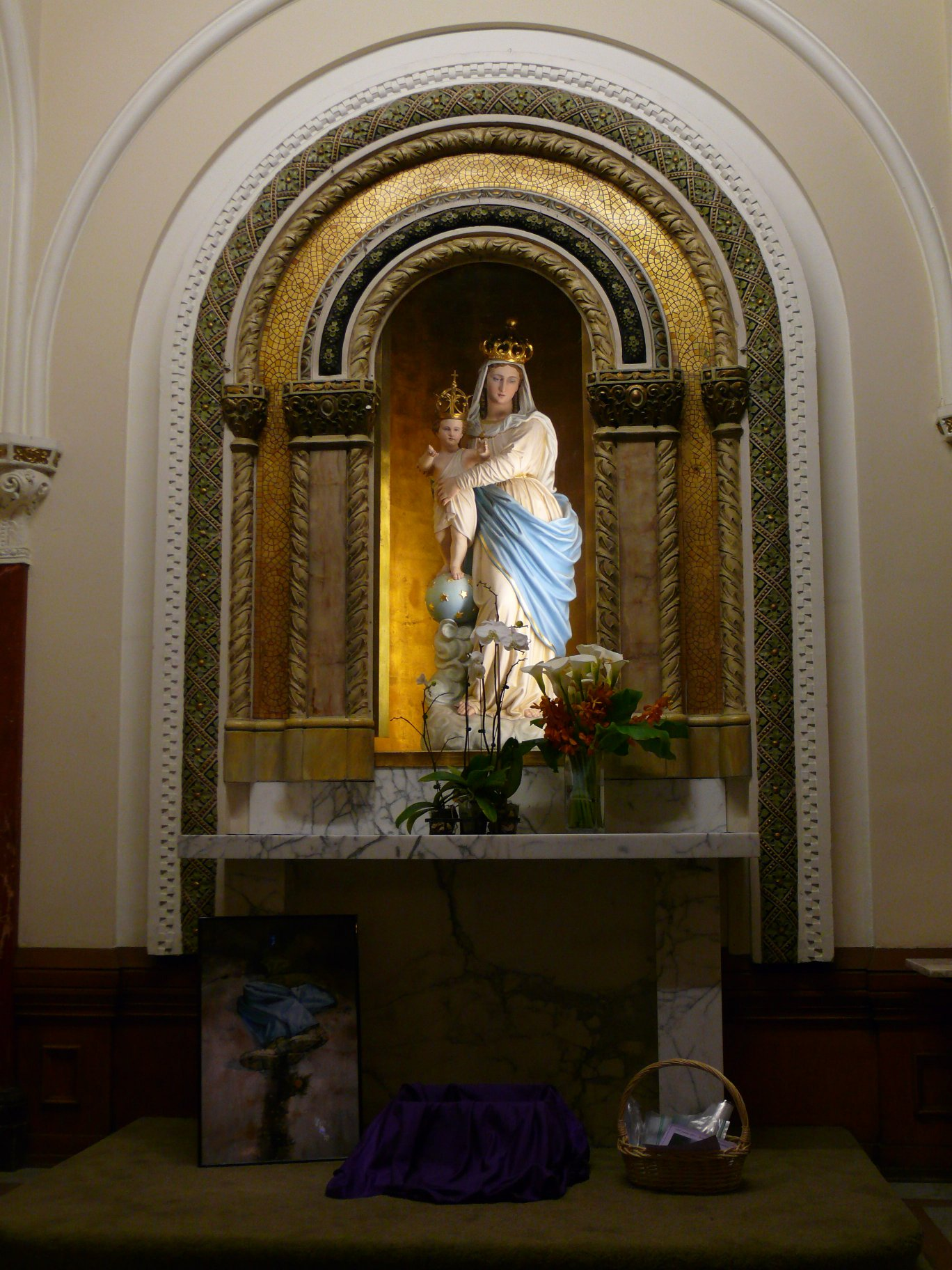
Statue of the Virgin
