= Embassy of Mexico, Washington, D.C. =

Diplomatic mission from Mexico to the United States

Coordinates: 38.9007°N 77.044°W

Embassy of Mexico in the United States
- Embajada de Mexico en los Estados Unidos

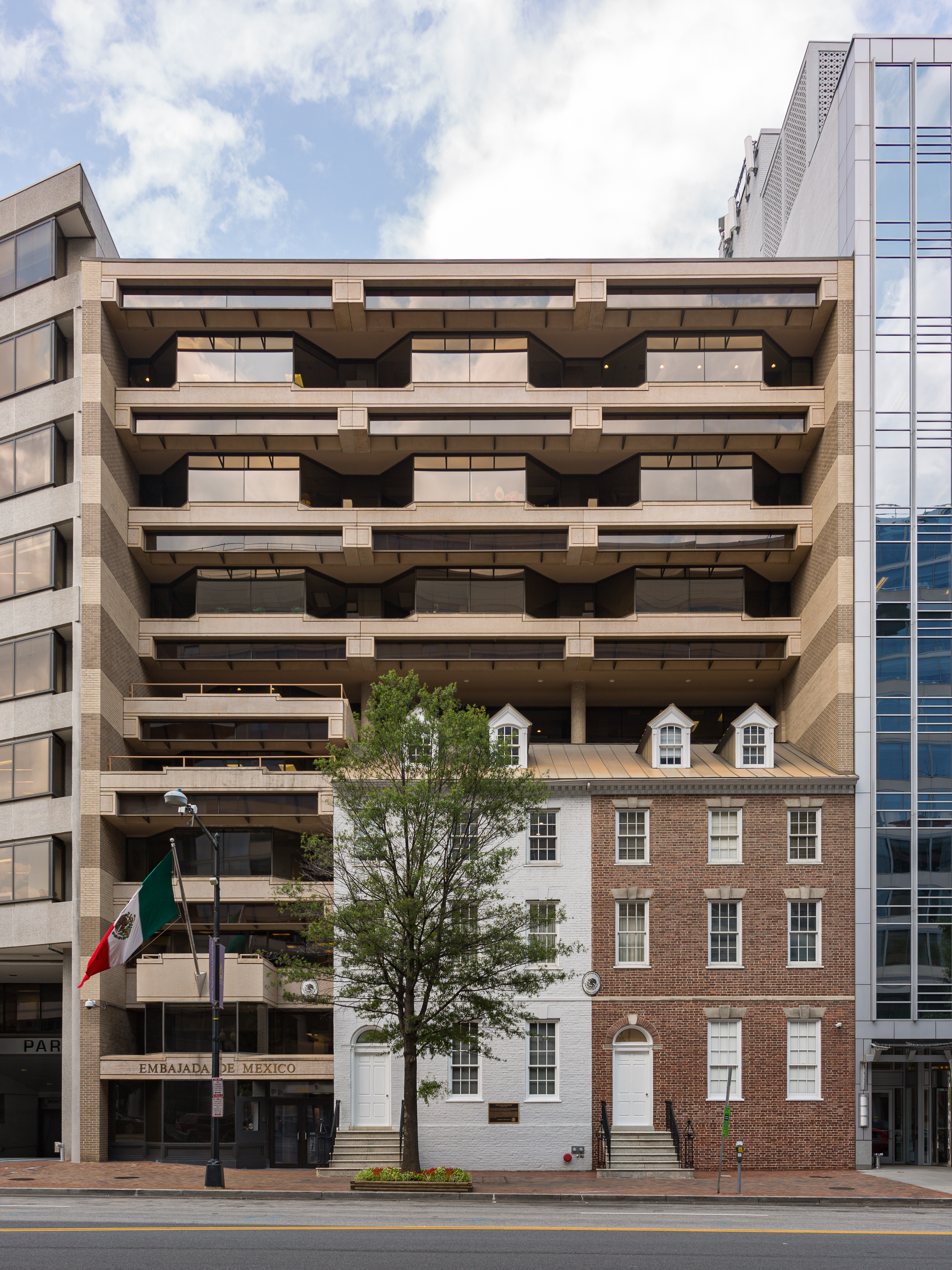
- Incumbent; Roberto Lazzeri since 11 June 2026
- Style: Excellency
- Type: Diplomatic mission
- Status: Active
- Reports to: Secretariat of Foreign Affairs
- Seat: Chancery building 1911 Pennsylvania Avenue N.W. Washington, D.C.
- Appointer: President of Mexico with Senate advice and consent
- Term length: No set term length
- Formation: 1822
- First holder: José Manuel Zozaya Bermúdez
- Website: www.embamex.sre.gob.mx/eua

The Embassy of Mexico in Washington, D.C. houses the diplomatic mission from Mexico to the United States.

== Location ==
The Embassy is located at 1911 Pennsylvania Avenue NW, in the Foggy Bottom neighborhood of Washington, D.C.

Prior to this, from 1921 to 1989, the Embassy was located in the MacVeagh House on 16th Street. The Government of Mexico purchased the House for $330,000 and immediately added a chancery wing to meet its function as an Embassy. However, by the mid 80s the number of staff had grown and the house could no longer accommodate the Embassy comfortably. The Embassy was moved to its current location, albeit without its consular division, which stayed at the MacVeagh House. In 1990, the Mexican Cultural Institute was also moved into the building.

The building that the Embassy now occupies was designed by architect Peter Vercelli and built in 1986. The building incorporates the façades of the last two remaining of the Seven Buildings, some of the oldest residential structures in Washington, D.C.

== Ambassador ==
The Ambassador of Mexico to the United States is the highest ranking diplomatic representative of the United Mexican States to the United States of America and hold the rank of "ambassador extraordinary and plenipotentiary." The following is a list of Mexican ambassadors since 2006:

- Under President Felipe Calderón Hinojosa (2006 – 2012)
  - 2006 – 2012: Arturo Sarukhan
- Under President Enrique Peña Nieto (2012 – 2018)
  - 2012 – 2015: Eduardo Medina-Mora Icaza
  - 2015 – 2016: Miguel Basáñez Ebergenyi
  - 2016 – 2017: Carlos Manuel Sada Solana
  - 2017 – 2018: Gerónimo Gutiérrez Fernández
- Under President Andrés Manuel López Obrador (2018 – 2024)
  - 2019 – 2020: Martha Bárcena Coqui
  - 2021 – 2026: Esteban Moctezuma Barragán
- Under President Claudia Sheinbaum (2024 – Present)
  - 2026 – Present: Roberto Lazzeri

== Embassy sections ==
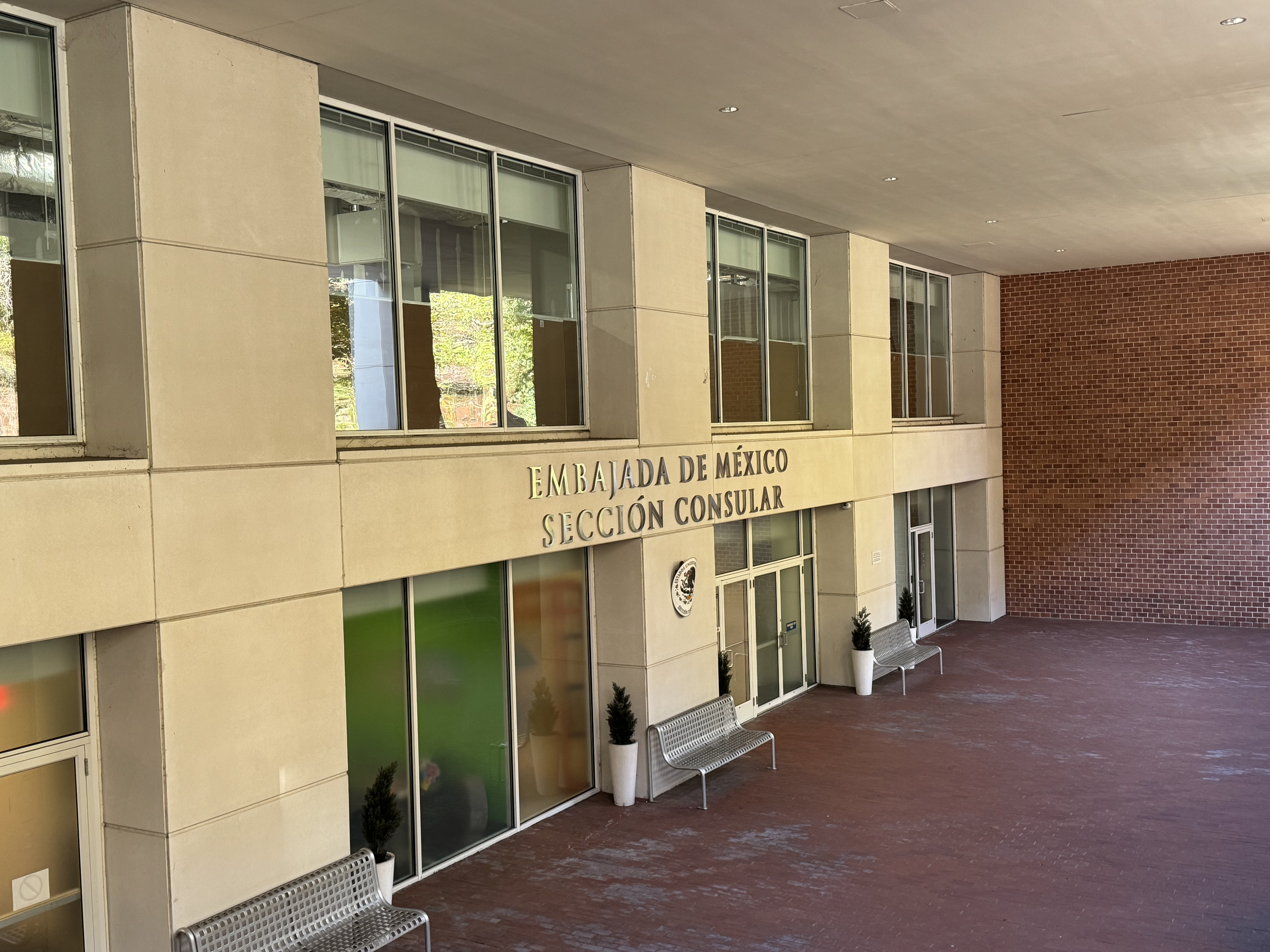
Consular section of the embassy in Washington, D.C. located at 1250 23rd Street NW

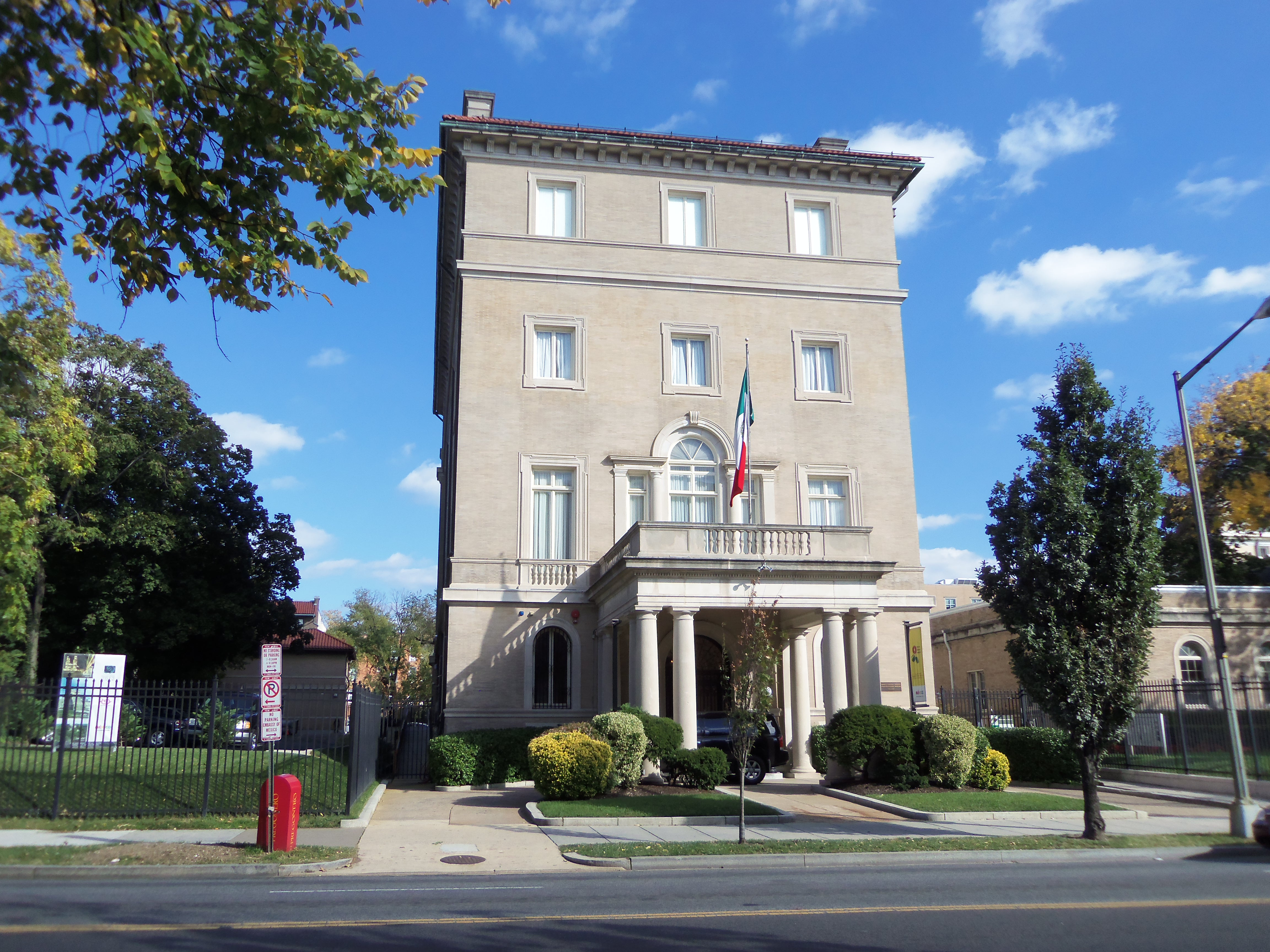
Mexican Cultural Institute in Washington, D.C. on 16th Street

The Embassy exercises a number of functions in its representation to the Government of the United States, including political, administrative, economic, public diplomacy, and consular affairs, that are managed by officials from the Secretariat of Foreign Affairs:

- Office of the Ambassador
- Office of the Chief of the Chancellery
- Office of Political Affairs
- Office of Congressional Relations
- Office of Protocol
- Office of the Press and Media
- Office of Legal Affairs
- Office of Communication and Public Diplomacy
- Office of Economic Affairs
- Office of Hispanic and Migratory Affairs
- Office of Border and Special Affairs
- Office of Administrative Affairs
- Office of Management
- Office of Archives
- IT office
- Mexican Cultural Institute

The consular division of the Embassy is not housed at the chancery, and is instead located in a building on 23rd Street NW.

== Consulates ==
Mexico also maintains 21 consulates general and 31 consulates across the United States and its territories.

=== Consulates-General ===
- Atlanta, Georgia
- Austin, Texas
- Boston, Massachusetts
- Chicago, Illinois
- Dallas, Texas
- Denver, Colorado
- El Paso, Texas
- Houston, Texas
- Laredo, Texas
- Los Angeles, California
- Miami, Florida
- New York City, New York
- Nogales, Arizona
- Phoenix, Arizona
- Raleigh, North Carolina
- Sacramento, California
- San Antonio, Texas
- San Diego, California
- San Francisco, California
- San Jose, California
- San Juan, Puerto Rico

=== Consulates ===
- Albuquerque, New Mexico
- Boise, Idaho
- Brownsville, Texas
- Calexico, California
- Del Rio, Texas
- Detroit, Michigan
- Douglas, Arizona
- Eagle Pass, Texas
- Fresno, California
- Indianapolis, Indiana
- Kansas City, Missouri
- Las Vegas, Nevada
- Little Rock, Arkansas
- McAllen, Texas
- Milwaukee, Wisconsin
- New Brunswick, New Jersey
- New Orleans, Louisiana
- Oklahoma City, Oklahoma
- Omaha, Nebraska
- Orlando, Florida
- Oxnard, California
- Philadelphia, Pennsylvania
- Portland, Oregon
- Presidio, Texas
- Saint Paul, Minnesota
- Salt Lake City, Utah
- San Bernardino, California
- Santa Ana, California
- Seattle, Washington
- Tucson, Arizona
- Yuma, Arizona

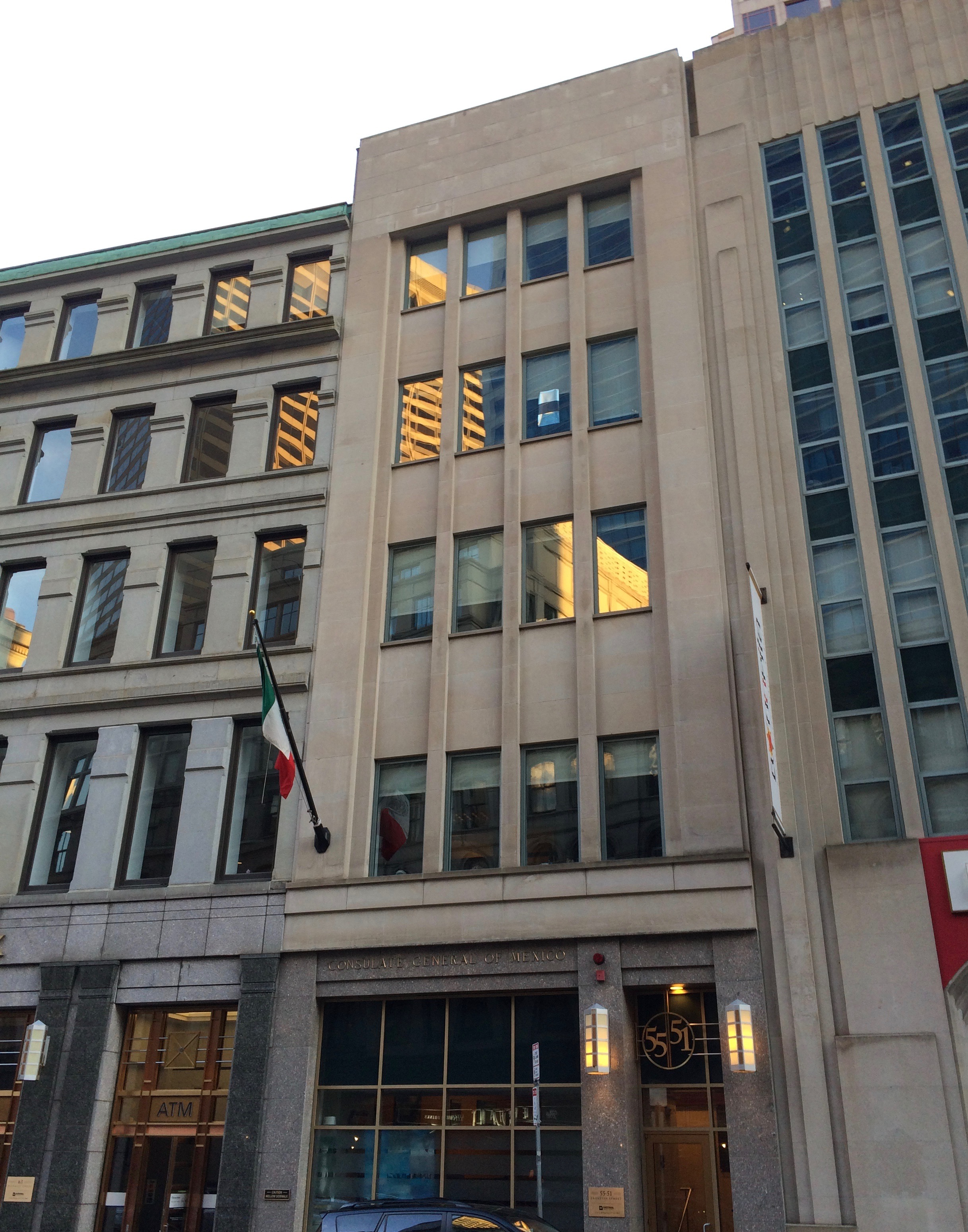
Consulate-General of Mexico in Boston

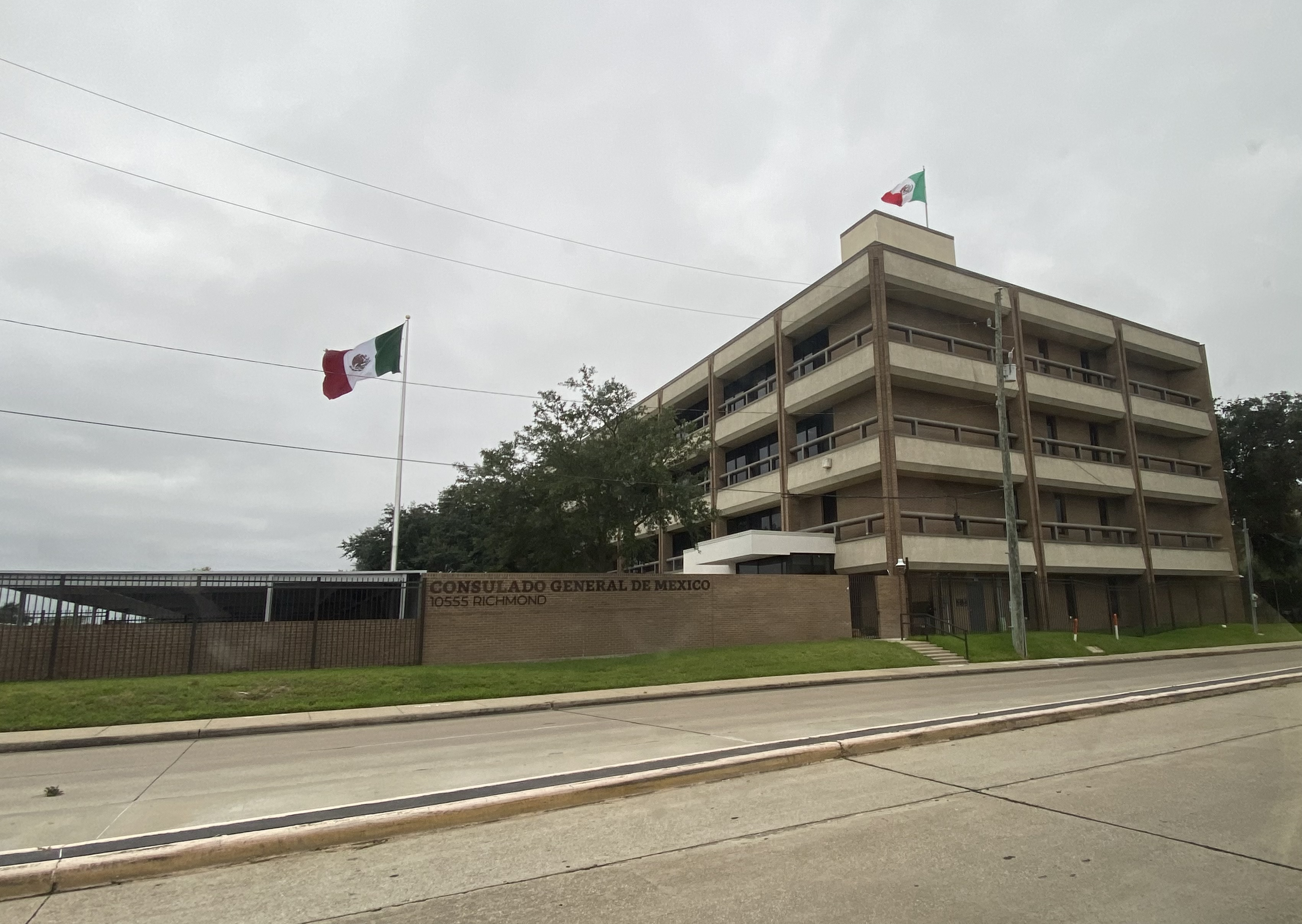
Consulate-General of Mexico in Houston

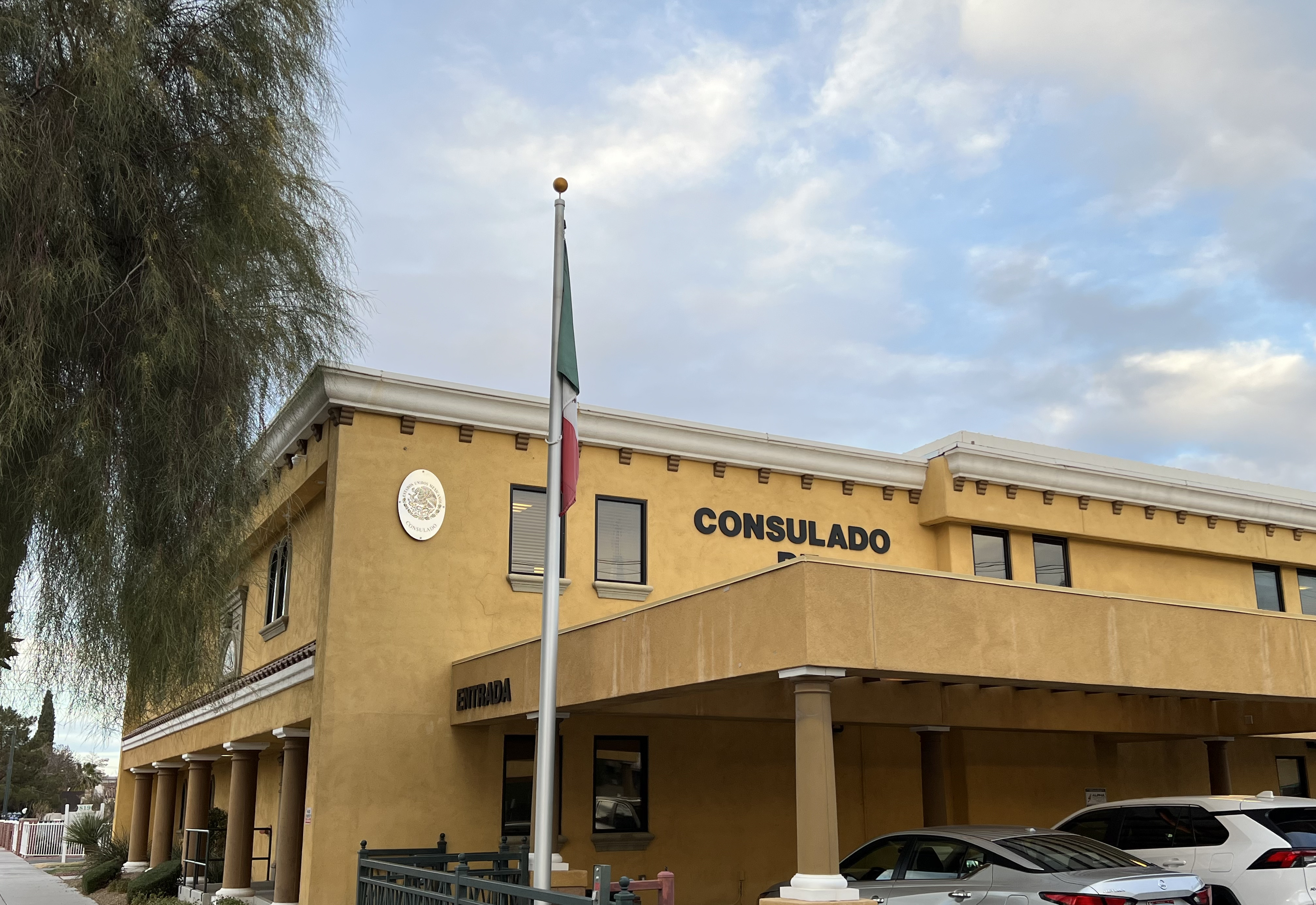
Consulate of Mexico in Las Vegas

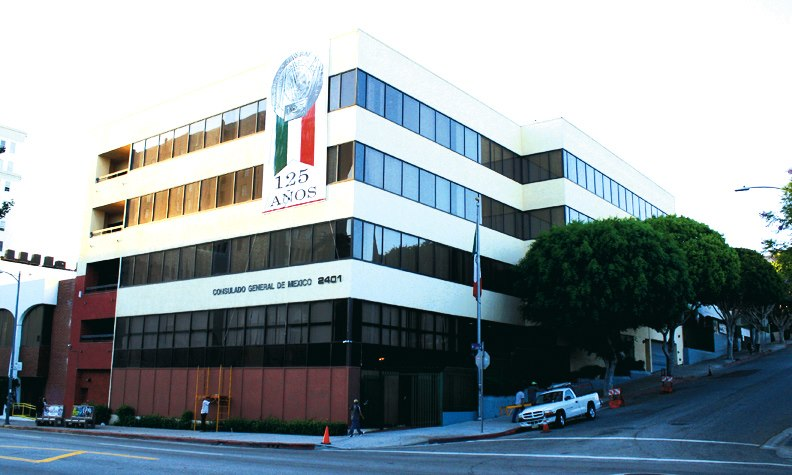
Consulate-General of Mexico in Los Angeles

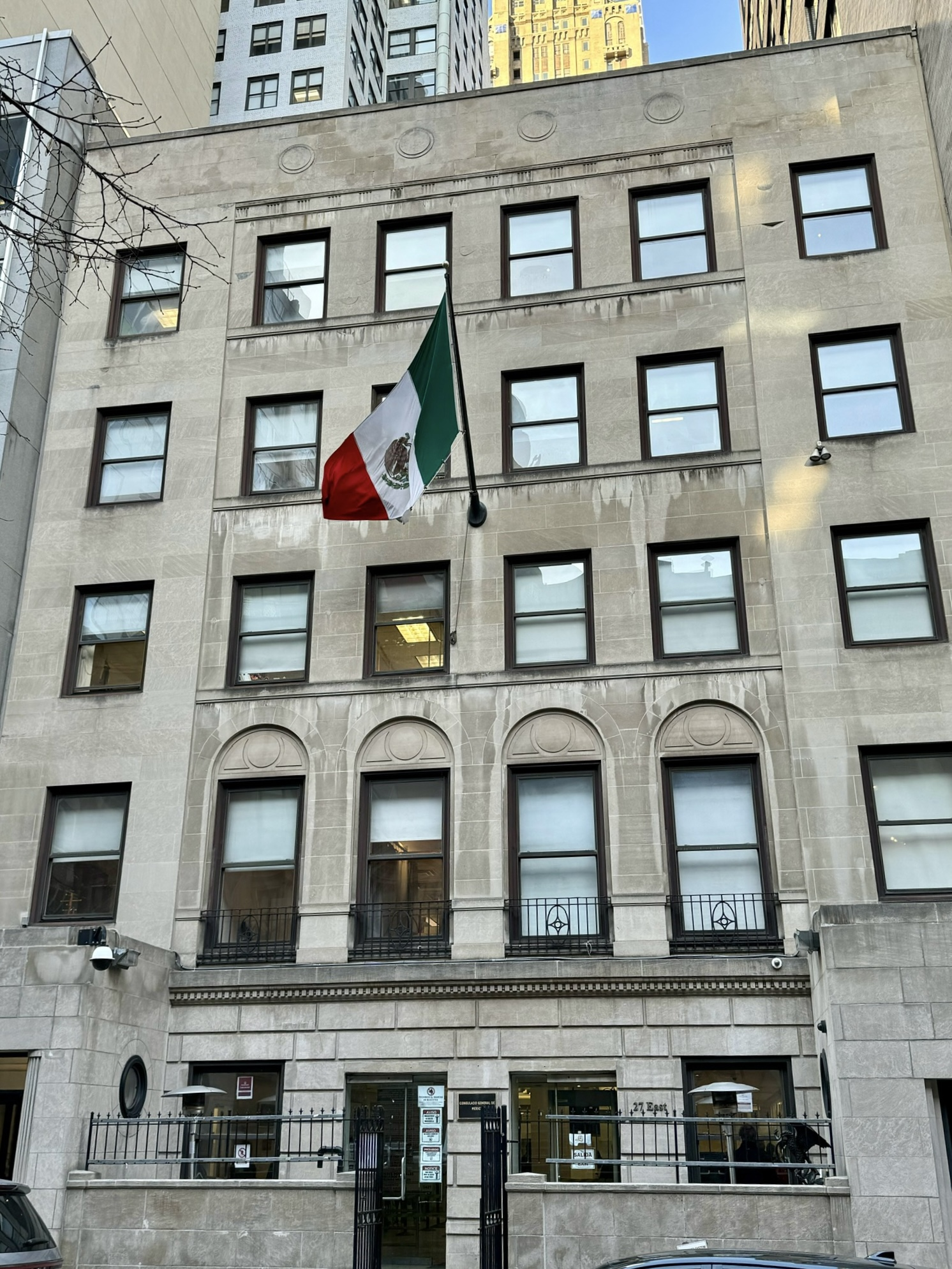
Consulate-General of Mexico in New York City

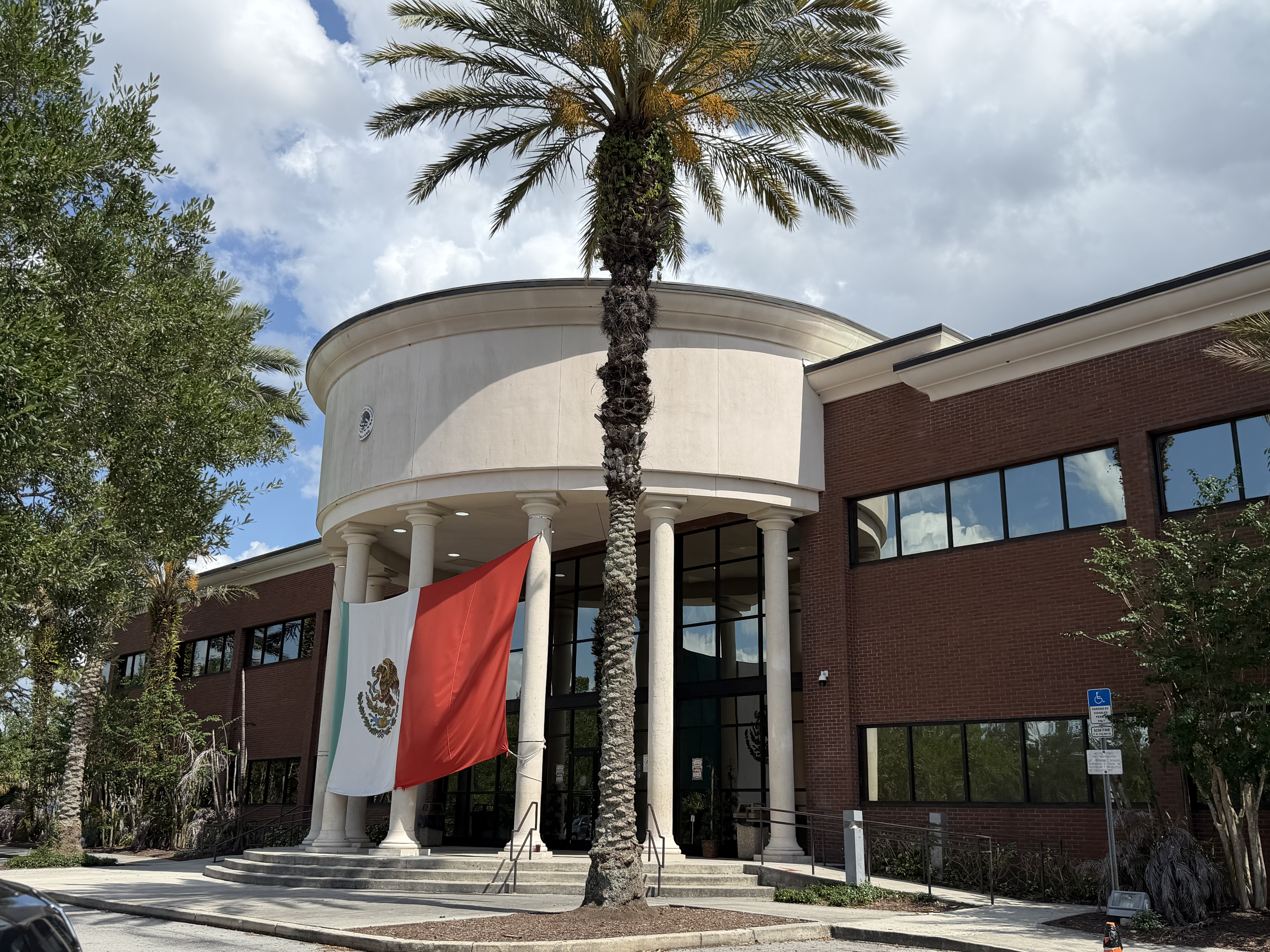
Consulate of Mexico in Orlando

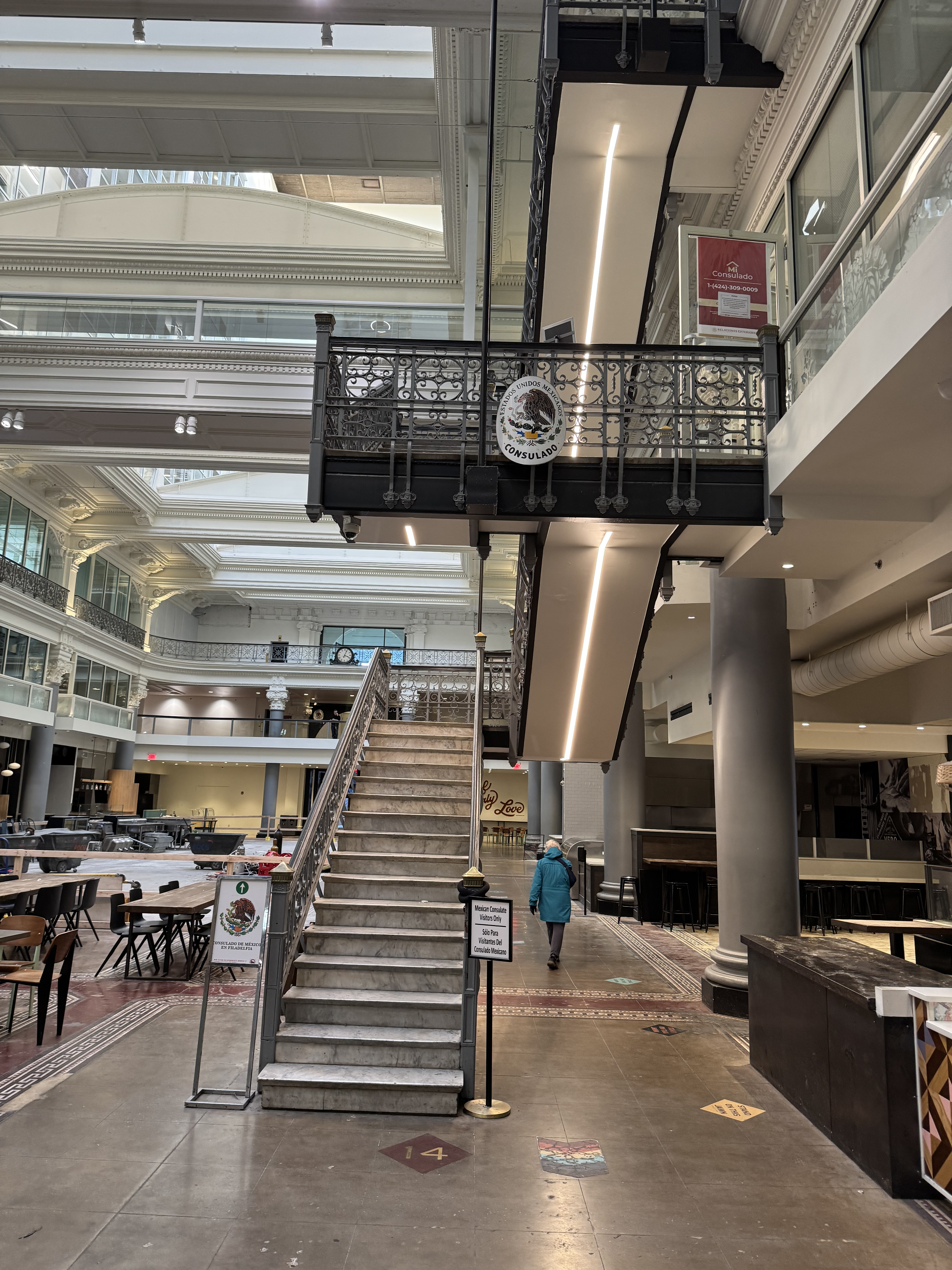
Consulate in Philadelphia

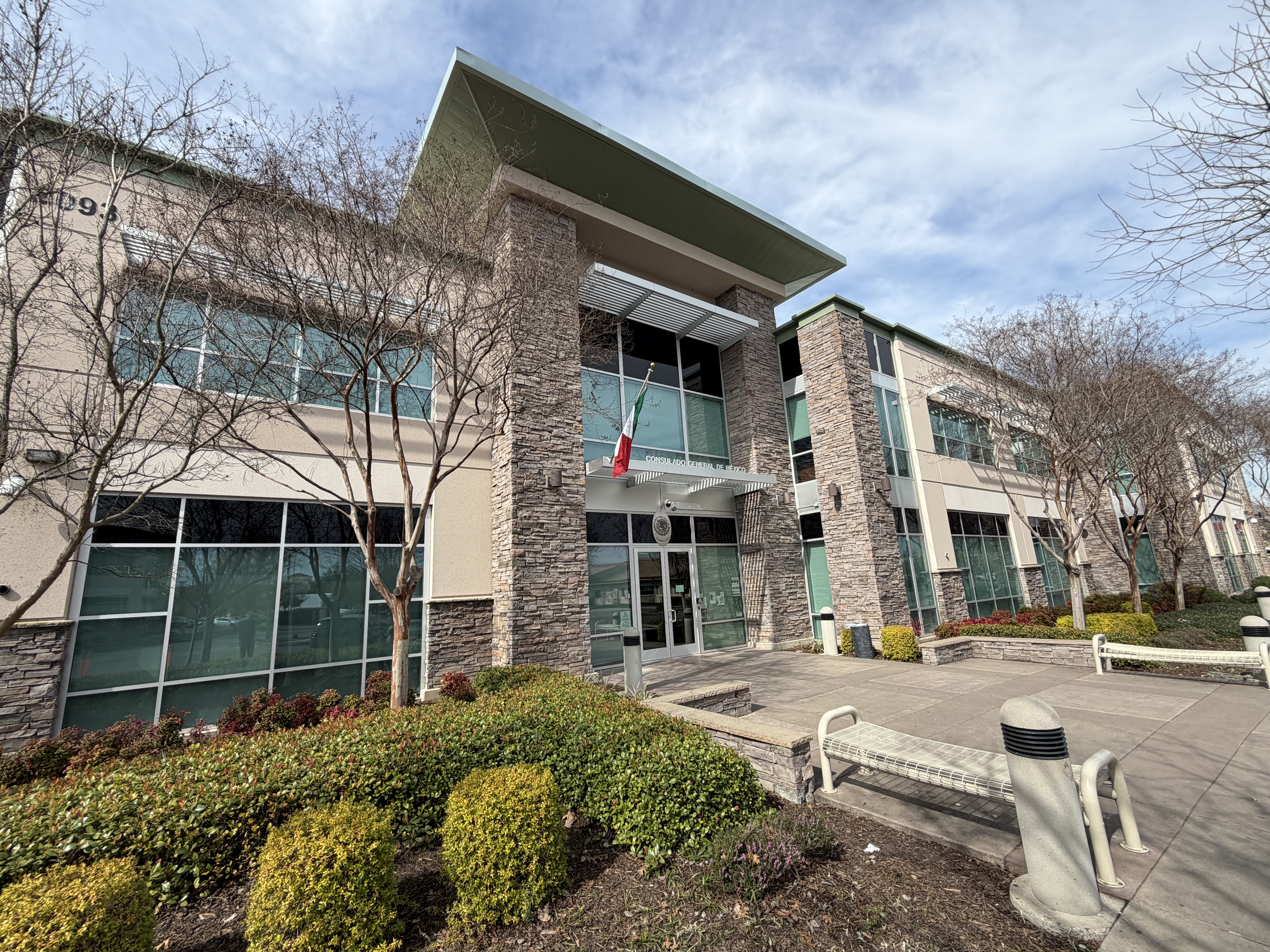
Consulate-General of Mexico in Sacramento

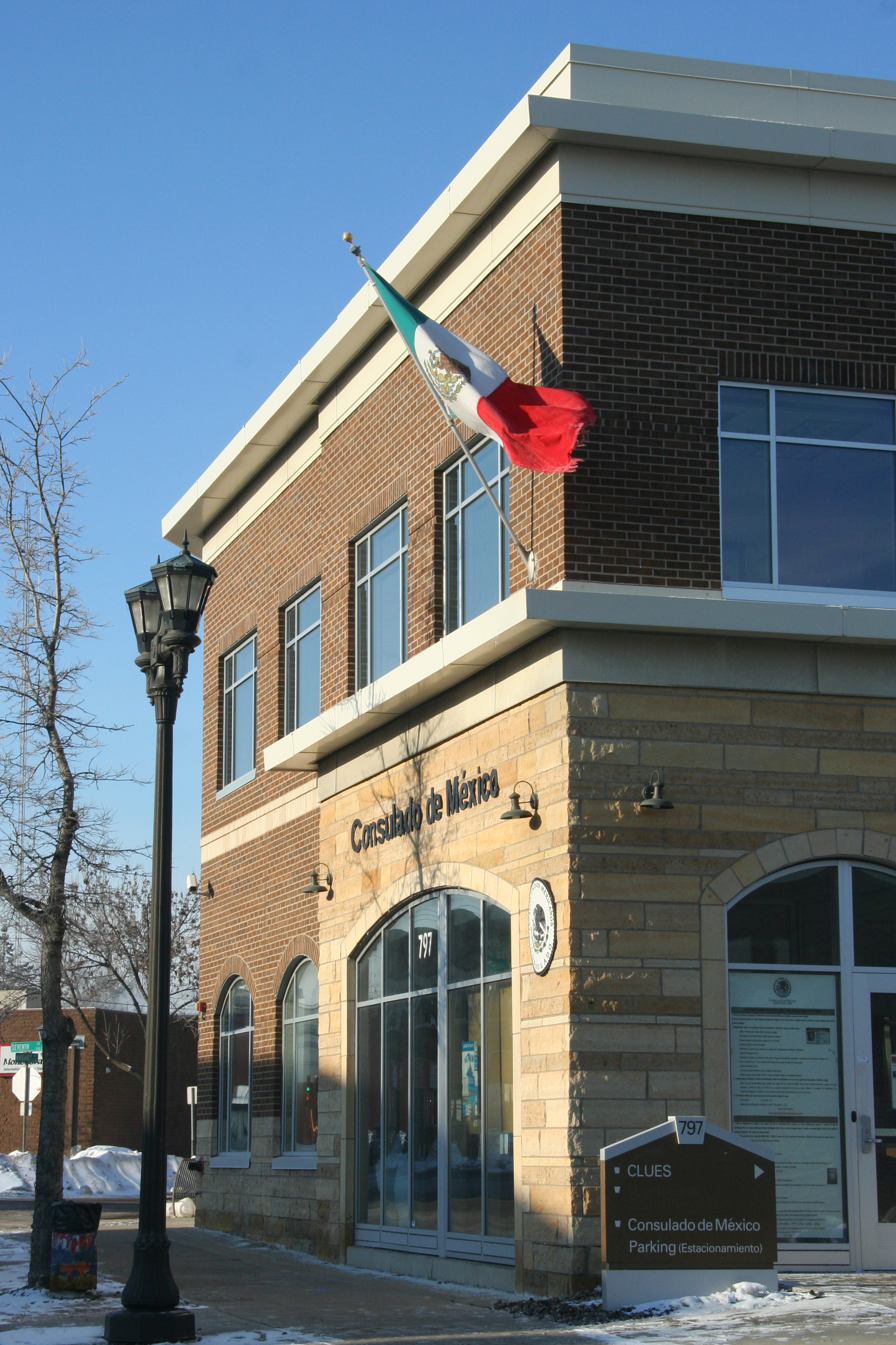
Consulate of Mexico in Saint Paul

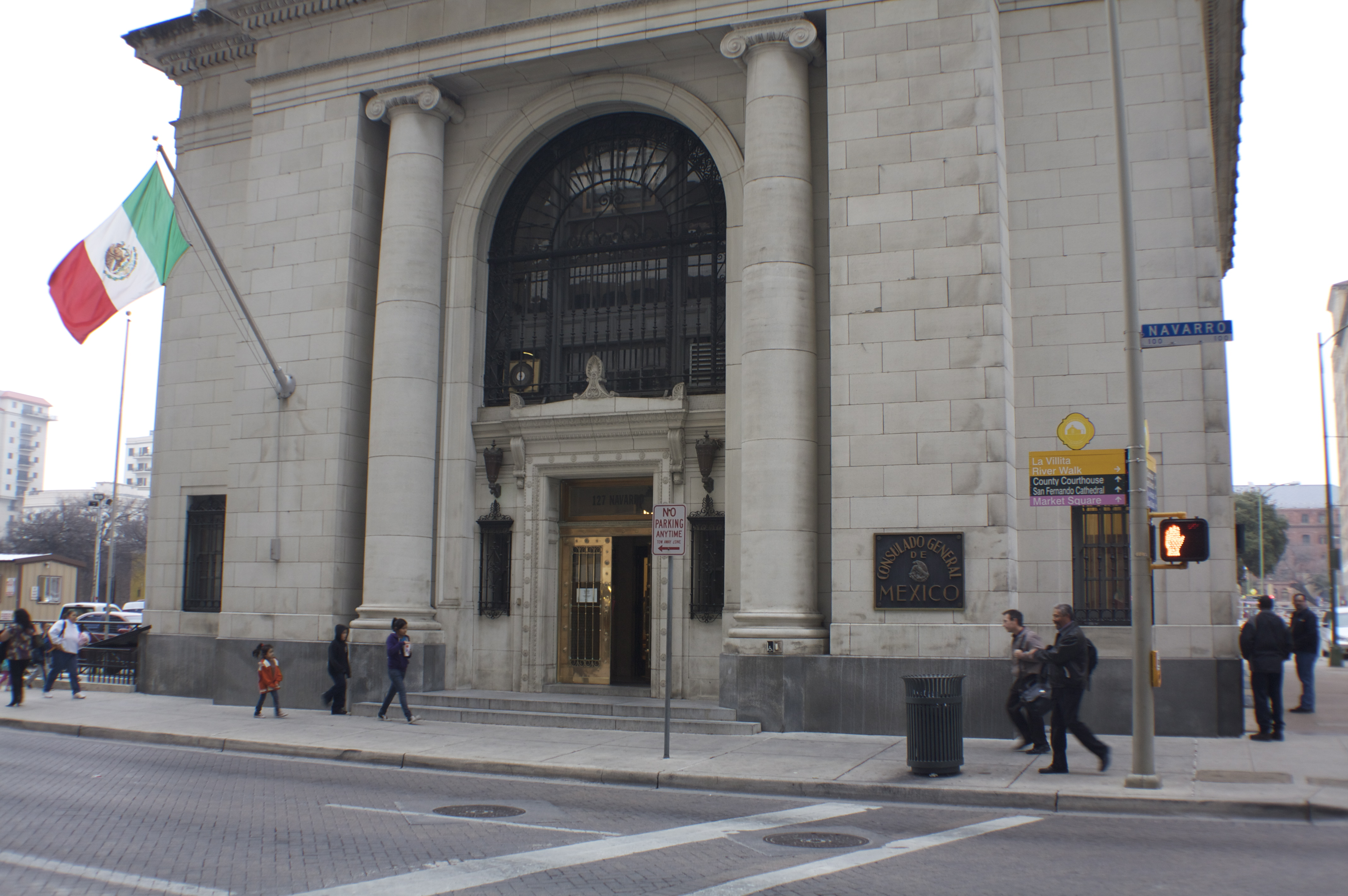
Consulate-General of Mexico in San Antonio

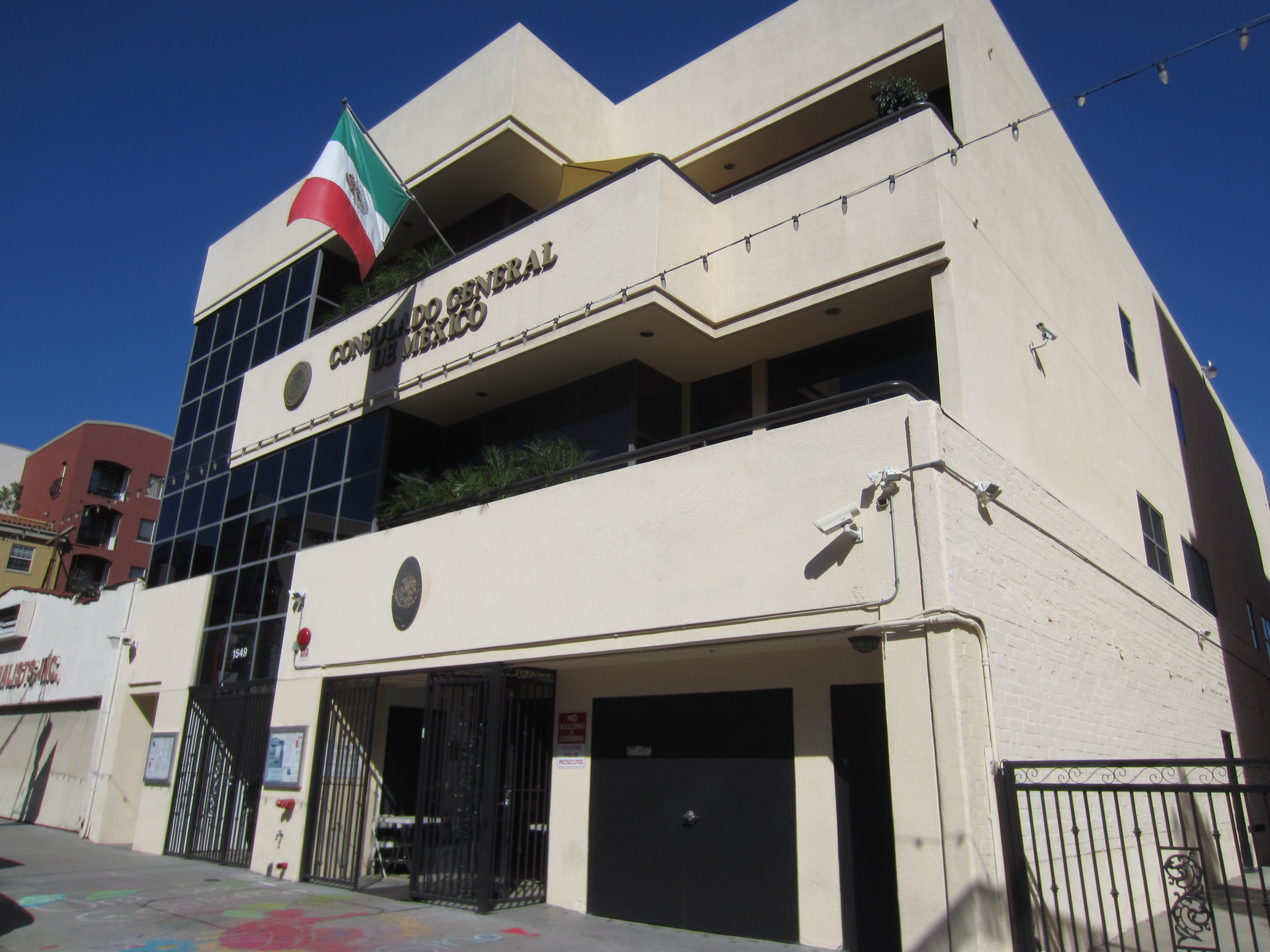
Consulate-General of Mexico in San Diego

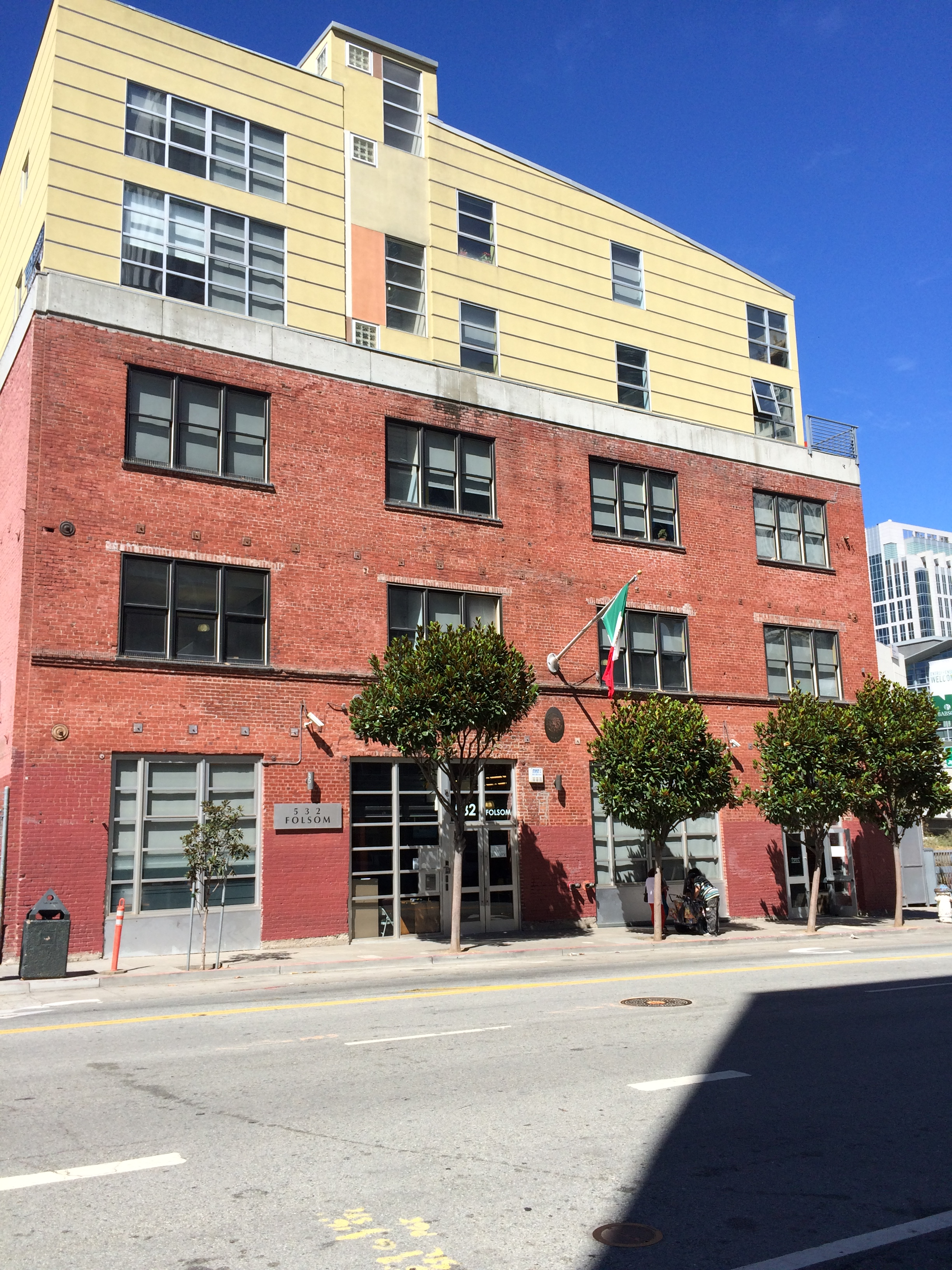
Consulate-General of Mexico in San Francisco

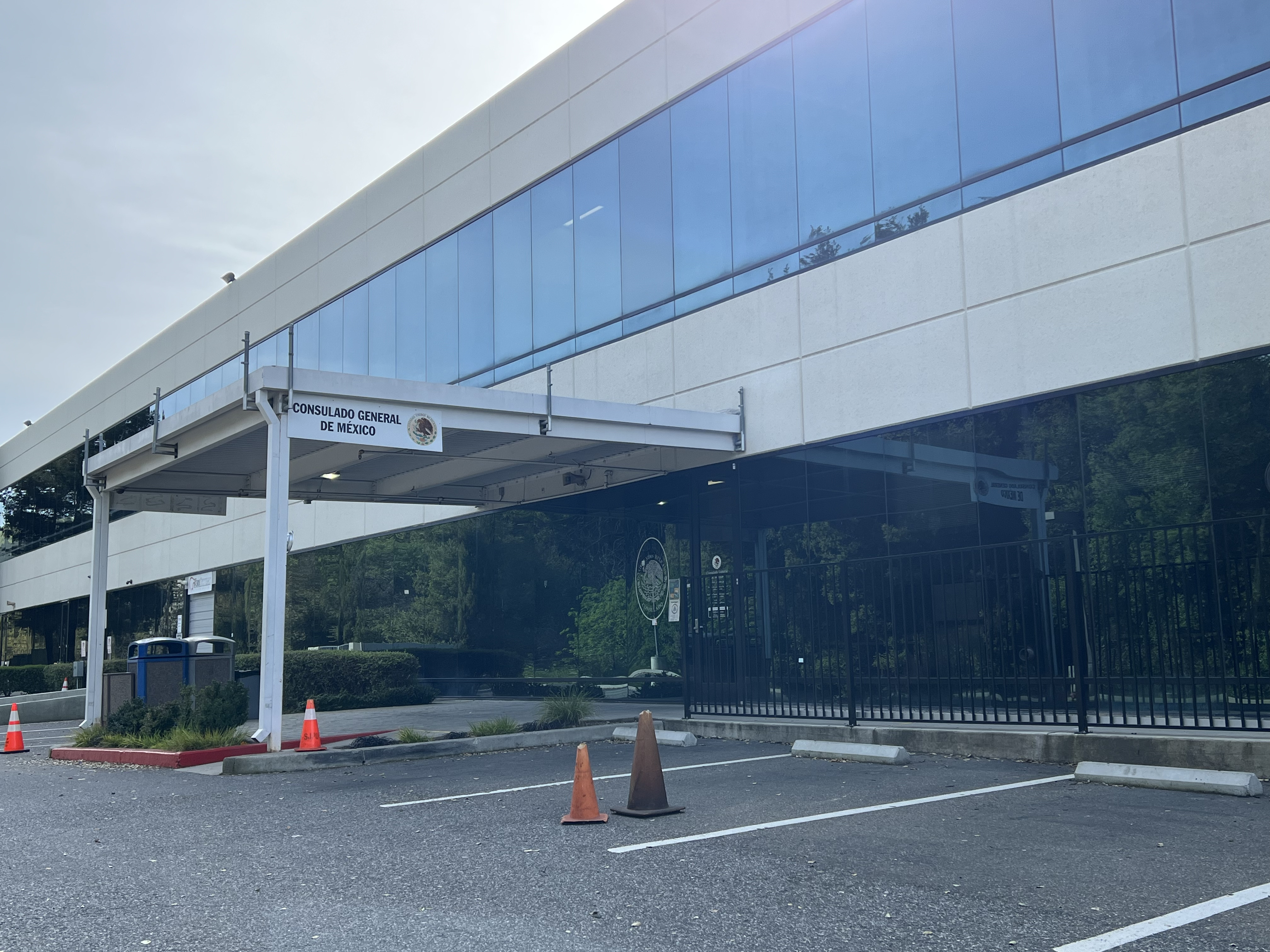
Consulate-General in San Jose

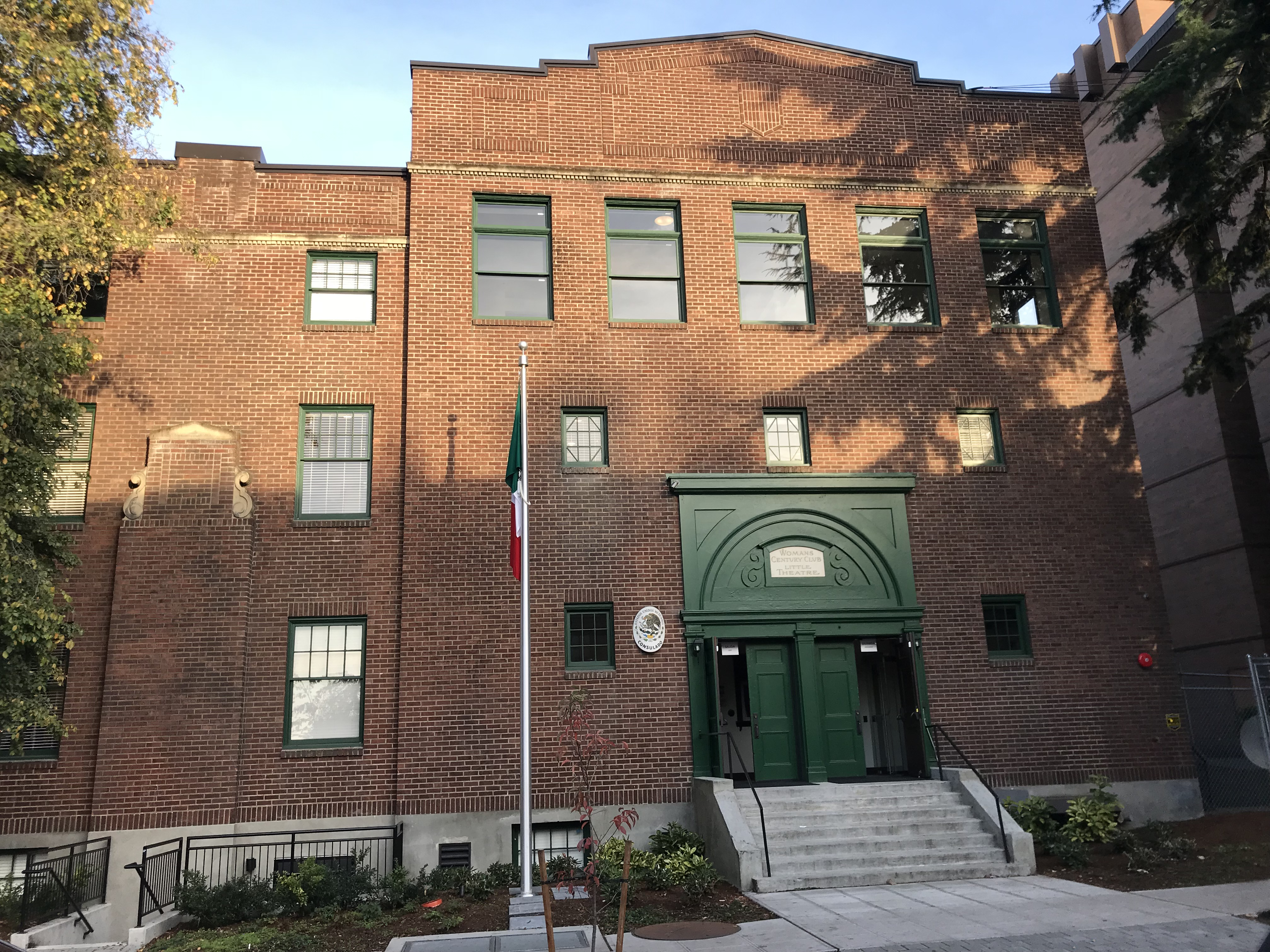
Consulate of Mexico in Seattle

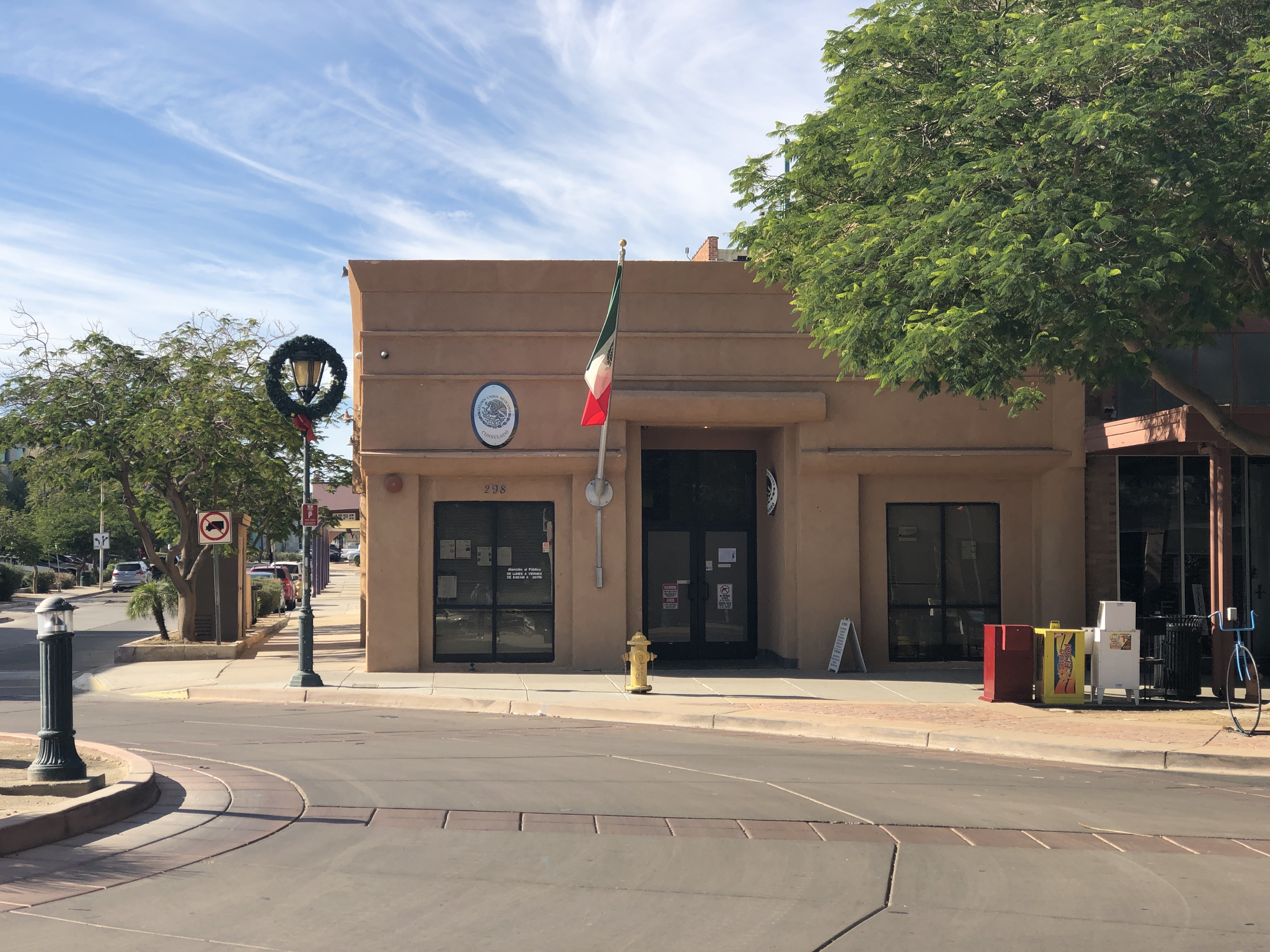
Consulate of Mexico in Yuma

== See also ==
- Ambassador of Mexico to the United States
- Embassy of the United States, Mexico City
- Foreign relations of Mexico
- List of diplomatic missions of Mexico
- Mexican Secretariat of Foreign Affairs
- Mexico–United States relations
- United States Ambassador to Mexico
