= Seven Buildings =

Townhouses in Washington, D.C.

Coordinates: 38.9007°N 77.0441°W

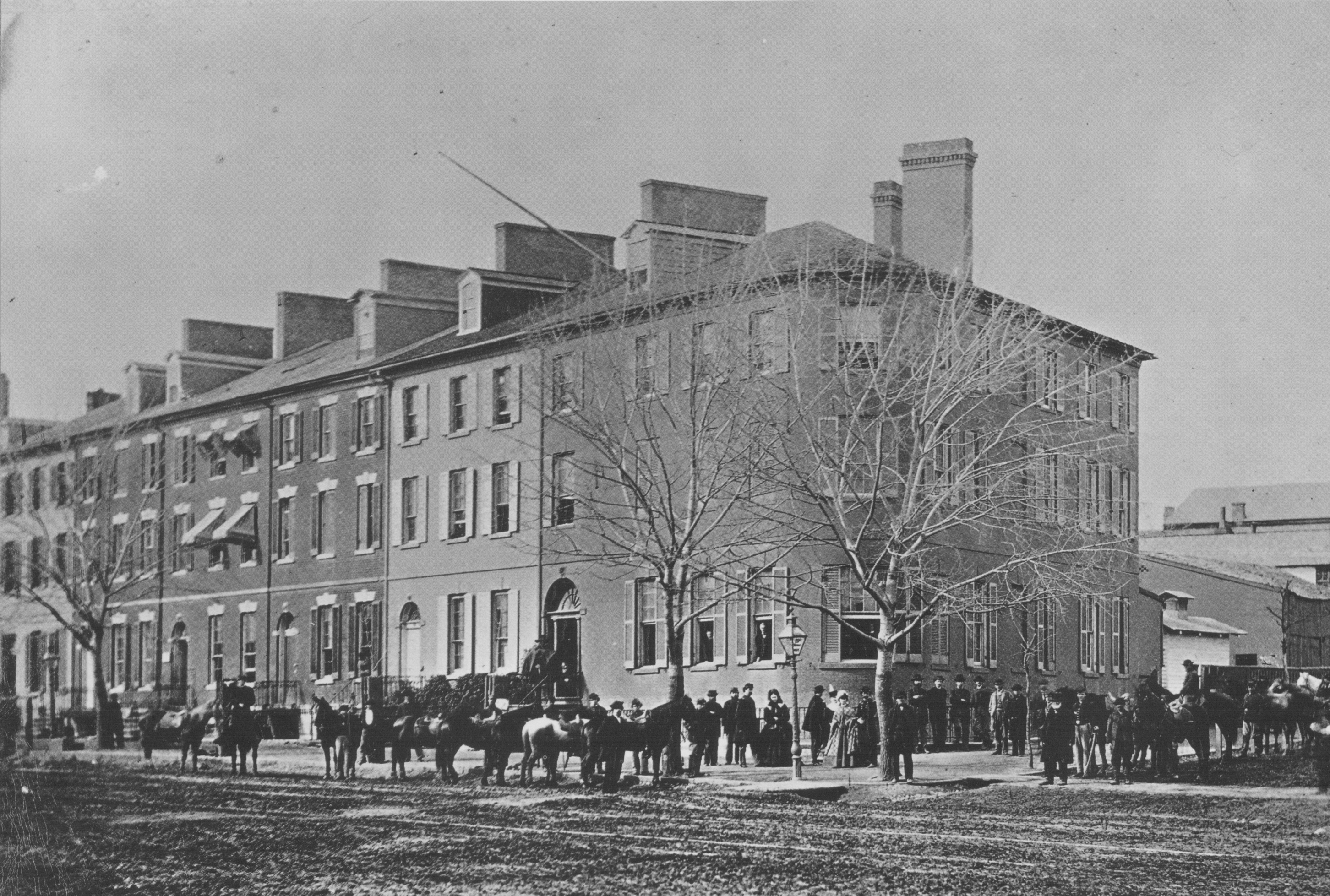
The Seven Buildings in 1865.

The Seven Buildings were seven townhouses constructed on the northwest corner of Pennsylvania Avenue NW and 19th Street NW in Washington, D.C., in 1796. They were some of the earliest residential structures built in the city. One of the Seven Buildings was the presidential home of President James Madison and his wife, Dolley, after the burning of the White House in 1814, and later the residence of Martin Van Buren shortly before and after his inauguration as president. Most of the buildings were demolished in 1959. The facades of two buildings were incorporated into the Embassy of Mexico in 1986.

== Overview ==
The Residence Act of 1790, which established the District of Columbia as the site for the capital of the United States, provided for the appointment of three commissioners by the President (without the need for Senate confirmation) to govern the District of Columbia, survey its land, purchase property from private landowners, and construct federal buildings. On December 24, 1793, James Greenleaf and Robert Morris purchased 6,000 lots from the commissioners and began marketing them for sale and development. In November 1794, General Walter Stewart purchased the seven lots at 1901 to 1913 Pennsylvania Avenue and constructed seven three-story townhouses on the property. They were not the first residences to be constructed in the District of Columbia. Many of the residences in Georgetown, Hamburgh Village (the current neighborhood of Foggy Bottom), and on the many farms in what became D.C. preceded them. However, they were among the earliest residential homes to be constructed in the new "Federal City" in the District of Columbia. They were certainly among the finest: They were exquisitely detailed, and an ornamental lintel with a sculpted woman's head was placed above each front door.

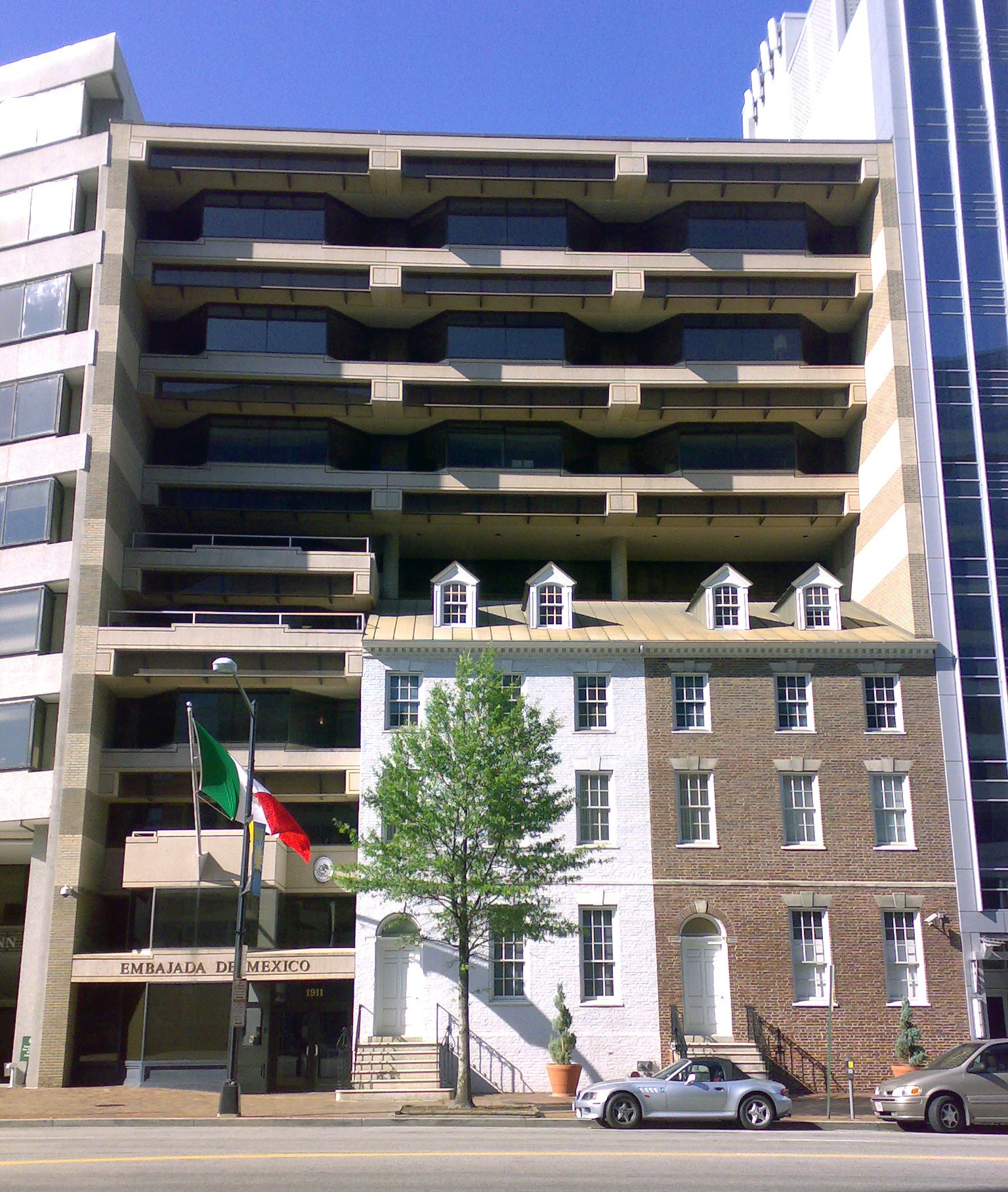
The remaining facades of the Seven Buildings, incorporated into a 1986 office building (2007)

1901 Pennsylvania Avenue NW was the most famous of the seven structures. After the Burning of Washington by British troops in 1814, President James Madison and his wife, Dolley, lived in the building from October 1815 to March 1817 while the White House was restored. It had the nickname of "House of a Thousand Candles" after the Madisons hosted a reception for General Andrew Jackson and his wife in the building in late 1815. It was also known as the "Gerry House" because Elbridge Gerry lived in it while he was vice president from 1813 till his death in 1814. Vice President Martin Van Buren lived for a short period in this house as well, just before he was elected. He stayed in it until shortly after his inauguration.

It is often reported, such as on the plaque erected on the remaining facades, that the corner house served briefly as the State Department headquarters from 1800 to 1801, and thus was where the Constitution and Declaration of Independence were stored, but this is due to confusion between this row and the "Six Buildings" further down the street. The "Six Buildings" had a seventh building added on later and this is the source of the confusion.

From 1804 to 1811, the corner house was the French Embassy and from 1811 until the outbreak of the War of 1812 it was the British Embassy. Stephen Decatur purchased 1907 and 1909 Pennsylvania Avenue in 1816 and lived in one of them in from 1817 to 1818. It was his first home in D.C.

During the American Civil War, General George B. McClellan and General Martin Davis Hardin both had their headquarters in the Seven Buildings. Some time after 1865, a fourth story was built atop 1903 Pennsylvania Avenue NW.

During their first 50 years, the Seven Buildings were some of the most fashionable addresses in the city. But by the 1890s, they were being used as commercial structures rather than homes.

== Demolition and remaining facades ==
The first of the Seven Buildings to be razed was 1913 Pennsylvania Avenue NW which was replaced in 1898 with a new four-story building. The next three buildings, consisting of the addresses 1901–1907 Pennsylvania Avenue NW, were razed in 1959 and a large, modern office building was constructed on the site.

In 1986, the last two remaining buildings were gutted and their facades incorporated into a $4.5 million, nine-story office building. The office building now houses the Embassy of Mexico.

== Bibliography ==
- Abbot, William Wright; Chase, Philander D.; Hoth, David R.; Patrick, Christian Sternberg; and Twohig, Dorothy, eds. The Papers of George Washington, Presidential Series: 1 January-30 April 1794. Charlottesville, Va.: University Press of Virginia, 2009.
- Allison, Robert J. Stephen Decatur: American Naval Hero, 1779–1820. Amherst, Mass.: University of Massachusetts Press, 2007.
- Berges, Steve. Charters of Liberty: The Declaration of Independence, the United States Constitution, and the Bill of Rights. Milwaukee: American Liberty Press, 2010.
- Bergheim, Laura. The Washington Historical Atlas: Who Did What, When, and Where in the Nation's Capital. Rockville, Md.: Woodbine House, 1992.
- Brand, Stewart. How Buildings Learn: What Happens After They're Built. New York: Viking, 1994.
- Bryan, Wilhelmus B. A History of the National Capital: From Its Foundation Through the Period of the Adoption of the Organic Act. New York: Macmillan, 1914.
- Eberlein, Harold Donaldson and Hubbard, Cortlandt Van Dyke. Historic Houses of George-Town & Washington City. Richmond, Va.: Dietz Press, 1958.
- Gary, Ralph. The Presidents Were Here: A State-By-State Historical Guide. Jefferson, N.C.: McFarland & Co., 2008.
- Goode, James M. Capital Losses: A Cultural History of Washington's Destroyed Buildings. Washington, D.C.: Smithsonian Institution Press, 1979.
- Greer, Mary A Catalogue of the exhibit of the Department of state at the Louisiana purchase exposition, St. Louis, 1904 Washington, D.C.: Government Printing Office, 1904
- Gutheim, Frederick. Worthy of the Nation: The History of Planning for the National Capital. 1st ed. Washington, D.C.: Smithsonian Institution Press, 1977.
- Haas, Irvin. Historic Homes of the American Presidents. New York: Dover Publishing, 1991.
- Kelly, Charles Suddarth. Washington, D.C., Then and Now: 69 Sites Photographed in the Past and Present. New York: Dover Publishing, 1984.
- Perkins, Bradford. Prologue to War: England and the United States, 1805–1812. Berkeley, Calif.: University of California Press, 1961.
- Pinheiro, John C. "George Washington's Leadership Style and Conflict at the Federal City." In White House Studies Compendium. Vol. 5. Robert W. Watson, ed. New York: Nova Science Publishers, 2008.
- Tinkler, Robert. James Hamilton of South Carolina. Baton Rouge, La.: Louisiana State University Press, 2004.
- Webb, William Bensing and Wooldridge, John. Centennial History of the City of Washington, D.C. Dayton, Ohio: H.W. Crew, 1892
- Wang, Amy B. Fodor's 2008 Washington, D.C. New York: Fodor's Travel Publications, 2008.
