= Jovan (given name) =

Jovan (Serbian Cyrillic: Јован Church Slavonic: Їωан) is a Serbian male given name equivalent to English "John" or Slavic "Ivan", from Hebrew: יהוחנן. The name is common amongst Orthodox Christians as a result of John the Baptist (Sveti Jovan Krstitelj)

== Notable people with this name ==
=== A ===
- Jovan Aćimović (born 1948), Serbian footballer
- Jovan Adepo (born 1988), British-born American actor
- Jovan Ajduković (born 1968), Serbian linguist and writer
- Jovan Albanez (c. 17th-century – c. 1732), Habsburg Montenegrin-Serbian military leader
- Jovan Ali (born 1995), Trinidadian cricketer
- Jovan Anđelković (1942–1969), Serbian footballer
- Jovan Andrevski (fl. 2000–2001), Macedonian military leader
- Jovan Asen (a.k.a. John Komnenos Asen; fl. c. 1345–1363; died 1363), Bulgarian noble-born Serbian despot
- Jovan Atanacković (1848–1921), Serbian general
- Jovan Avakumović (1841–1928), Serbian lawyer, criminologist, statesman, and prime minister
- Jovan Avakumović (poet) (1748–1810), Habsburg Serbian noble, poet, and lawyer

=== B ===
- Jovan Babunski (a.k.a. Jovan Stojković; 1878–1920), Serbian Chetnik commander
- Jovan Baošić (born 1995), Montenegrin footballer
- Jovan Beader (born 1970), Serbian basketball coach
- Jovan Belcher (1987–2012), American football player
- Jovan Beleslin (born 1919), Hungarian-born Serbian footballer, manager, and referee
- Jovan Belimarković (1827–1906), Serbian regent and general
- Jovan Berislavić (a.k.a. Ivaniš Berislavić; fl. 1504–1514), Serbian despot
- Jovan Bijelić (c. 1885 – 1964), Serbian painter
- Jovan Blagojevic (disambiguation), several people
- Jovan Bowles (born 1983), South African rugby union footballer
- Jovan Bridges (stage named Yvie Oddly; born 1993), American drag queen, performer, fashion designer, rapper, and recording artist
- Jovan Branković (c. 1465 – 1502), Serbian titular despot, monarch, and saint
- Jovan Byford (born ?), Serbian social psychologist and conspiracy theory expert

=== C ===
- Jovan Čađenović (born 1995), Montenegrin footballer
- Jovan Campbell (stage named Jibbs; born 1990), American rapper
- Jovan Ćirilov (1931–2013), Serbian theatrologist, theatre selector, philosopher, writer, and poet
- Jovan Ćirković (1871–1928), Serbian teacher, Chetnik revolutionary, military leader, and politician
- Jovan Cokić (1927–2004), Serbian footballer
- Jovan Čokor (1885–1936), Serbian epidemiologist, infectologist, and physician
- Jovan Crnić (born 1994), Serbian basketball player
- Jovan Ćulibrk (born 1965), Serbian Orthodox Christian prelate and bishop, and music critic
- Jovan Cvetković [see: Jovan Dolgač (below)]
- Jovan Cvijić (1865–1927), Serbian geographer, ethnologist, sociologist, and geologist

=== D ===
- Jovan Damjanic (a.k.a. János Damjanich; 1804–1849), Austro-Hungarian Serbian Revolutionary Army commander
- Jovan Damjanović (born 1982), Serbian footballer and manager
- Jovan Dejanović (politician) (1927–2019), Serbian politician
- Jovan Deretić (disambiguation), several people
- Jovan Deroko (1912–1941), Serbian military commander
- Jovan Despotović (born 1962), Serbian art historian, critic, and writer
- Jovan Dimitrijević Dobrača (1765–1839), Serbian merchant, and revolutionary military financier and commander
- Jovan Divjak (1937–2021), Bosnian army general and writer
- Jovan Djaja (1846–1928), Serbian professor, journalist, translator, and politician
- Jovan Djordjević (born 1985), Serbian futsal player
- Jovan Đokić (born 1992), Serbian footballer
- Jovan Dolgač (a.k.a. Jovan Cvetković; 1860–1915), Macedonian-Serbian Chetnik commander, revolutionary, and weapons smuggler
- Jovan Đorđević (1826–1900), Serbian writer, dramatist, education minister, theater founder, and national anthem writer
- Jovan Došenović (1781–1813), Serbian philosopher, poet, and translator
- Jovan Dovezenski (a.k.a. Jovan Stanojković; 1873–1935), Serbian teacher and Chetnik commander
- Jovan Dragaš (1343–1378), Serbian noble and despot
- Jovan Dragoslav (fl. 1290–1315), Serbian noble and royal tax and treasury official
- Jovan Dučić (1871–1943), Herzegovinian-Serbian poet, writer, lyricist, diplomat, and politician
- Jovan Džiknić (born 1989), Serbian footballer

=== E ===
- Jovan Erdeljanović (1874–1944), Serbian and Yugoslav ethnologist

=== G ===
- Jovan Gavrilović (1796–1877), Serbian historian, politician, statesman, diplomat, prince's deputy, and people's benefactor
- Jovan Georgijević (c. 1710 –1773), Serbian Orthodox Christian metropolitan
- Jovan Gligorijević (a.k.a. Zeka Buljubaša; c. 1785 – 1813), Serbian noble and revolutionary captain
- Jovan Gojković (1975–2001), Serbian footballer
- Jovan Golić (born 1986), Bosnian footballer
- Jovan Grčić Milenko (1846–1875), Austro-Hungarian Serbian poet, writer, translator, and physician
- Jovan Grković-Gapon (1879–1912), Kosovar-Serbian Orthodox Christian monk and Chetnik

=== H ===
- Jovan Hadži (1884–1972), Austro-Hungarian Romanian-born Serbian-Slovenian zoologist and taxonomist
- Jovan Hadži-Vasiljević (1866–1948), Serbian historian, ethnographer, writer, journalist, and editor
- Jovan Hadžić (1799–1869), Habsburg Serbian writer, legislator, translator, and institute founder
- Jovan Hajduković (1943–2013), Hungarian-born Montenegrin footballer
- Jovan Haye (born 1982), Jamaican-born American football player
- Jovan Horvat (1722–1786), Habsburg Serbian-born Russian general and territorial founder

=== I ===
- Jovan Ilić (1824–1901), Serbian poet and politician
- Jovan Isailović (fl. 1772–1804), Serbian icon painter and muralist; grandfather of Jovan Isailović, Jr.
- Jovan Isailović, Jr. (1803–1885), Serbian academic painter; grandson of Jovan Isailović

=== J ===
- Jovan Jackson, American politician
- Jovan Jančić-Sarajlija [see: Jančić's rebellion] (died 1809), Serbian gunsmith, smuggler, and peasant revolt leader
- Jovan Janićijević Burduš (1932–1992), Serbian actor
- Jovan Jelovac (born ?), Serbian brand consultant and entrepreneur
- Jovan Jezerkić (1920–2000), Serbian footballer
- Jovan Jovanov (born 1981), Yugoslavian-born Canadian music producer, record engineer, and singer-songwriter
- Jovan Jovanović (disambiguation), several people
- Jovan Jugović (1886–1926), Serbian aviator and fighter pilot

=== K ===
- Jovan Kantul (a.k.a. Jovan II; fl. 1592–1614), Serbian archbishop and patriarch
- Jovan Kapičić (a.k.a. Jovo Kapičić; 1919–2013), Yugoslavian general and politician
- Jovan Karamata (1902–1967), Serbian mathematician, professor, and school founder
- Jovan Karlo Villalba (born 1977), American artist
- Jovan Kastratović (born 1993), Serbian footballer
- Jovan II Kastriot (a.k.a. Gjon Kastrioti II; 1456–1501), Albanian count and national liberation hero
- Jovan Kavarić (born 1934), Montenegrin clinical biochemist, professor, and politician
- Jovan Kirovski (born 1976), American soccer player, Olympics competitor, and coach
- Jovan Kokir (born 2000), Serbian footballer
- Jovan Kolundžija (born 1948), Serbian violin maestro and politician
- Jovan Koprivica (born 1982), Serbian basketball player
- Jovan Koseski (pen name of Janez Vesel; 1798–1884), Slovenian lawyer and poet
- Jovan Kostovski (born 1987), Macedonian footballer
- Jovan Kosturi (1831–1924), Albanian politician and Tosk Albanian dialect education advocate
- Jovan Kratohvil (1924–1998), Yugoslavian sports shooter and Olympics competitor
- Jovan Krkobabić (1930–2014), Serbian politician
- Jovan Krneta (born 1992), Serbian footballer
- Jovan Kursula (a.k.a. Jovan Petrović; 1768–1813), Serbian military commander, swordfighter, and revolutionary

=== L ===
- Jovan Lazarević (born 1952), Yugoslavian shot putter
- Jovan Lučić (born 1987), Canadian and Serbian footballer
- Jovan Lukić (footballer, born 1997) (born 1997), Serbian footballer
- Jovan Lukić (footballer, born 2002), Serbian footballer

=== M ===
- Jovan Maksimović (a.k.a. John of Shanghai and San Francisco; 1896–1966), Russian Orthodox Christian bishop and saint
- Jovan Maleševac (fl. 1524–1562), Serbian Orthodox Christian monk and scribe
- Jovan Mandil (1873–1916), Serbian Jewish lawyer, journalist, newspaper editor, and publicist
- Jovan Marić (born 1941), Serbian psychiatrist, author, sexologist, and professo
- Jovan Marinković (born 1996), Serbian footballer
- Jovan Marinović (1821–1893), Serbian politician and diplomat
- Jovan Markoski (born 1980), Serbian footballer
- Jovan Marković (born 2001), Romanian footballer
- Jovan Markovski (born 1988), Macedonian basketball player
- Jovan Markuš (born 1949), Montenegrin politician, journalist, publicist, historian, and heraldist
- Jovan Melton (born ?), American politician and consultant
- Jovan Mijušković (1886–1944), Serbian doctor and Nazi politician
- Jovan Mikić Spartak (1914–1944), Yugoslavian track and field athlete, Olympics competitor, and anti-fascist
- Jovan Miladinović (born 1982), Serbian footballer
- Jovan Mišković (1844–1908), Serbian general, war minister, military theorist, and writer
- Jovan Monasterlija (fl. 1683–1706), Austrian-Serbian duke, general, and militia commander
- Jovan Muškatirović (1743–1809), Habsburg Serbian author, lawyer, and educator

=== N ===
- Jovan Najdanović (born 1997), Serbian footballer
- Jovan Naumović (1879–1945), Yugoslavian Serbian army general
- Jovan Nenad (c. 1492 – 1527), Serbian noble and rebel monarch
- Jovan Nikolić (disambiguation), several people
- Jovan Ninković (born 1987), Serbian footballer
- Jovan Nišić (born 1998), Serbian footballer
- Jovan Novak (born 1994), Serbian basketball player

=== O ===
- Jovan Obrenović (1787–1850), Serbian general
- Jovan Olafioye (born 1987), US-born Canadian football player
- Jovan Oliver (c. 1310 – c. 1356), Serbian noble, general, despot, knight, and judge
- Jovan Ovčarević (fl. 1557), Habsburg Serbian noble

=== P ===
- Jovan Pačić (1771–1849), Serbian soldier, poet, writer, philologist, translator, illustrator, and painter
- Jovan Paču (1847–1942), Serbian composer, concert pianist, and physician
- Jovan Pajković (born 1946), Serbian boxer and Olympics competitor
- Jovan Palalić (born 1971), Serbian politician
- Jovan Pavlović (1936–2014), Serbian-Croatian Orthodox Christian metropolitan
- Jovan Pavlović (minister) (1843–1892), Serbian newspaper publisher and education minister
- Jovan Pešić (1866–1936), Serbian war painter and photographer, sculpture, and Chetnik soldier
- Jovan Petrović [see: Jovan Kursula (above)]
- Jovan Plamenac (1873–1944), Montenegrin and Yugoslavian politician, and Nazi collaborator
- Jovan Popović (disambiguation), several people
- Jovan Prokopljević (born 1940), Serbian architect, cartoonist, and caricaturist

=== R ===
- Jovan Radivojević (born 1982), Serbian footballer
- Jovan Radomir (born 1963), Bosnian Yugoslavian-born Swedish television presenter, actor, author, and lyricist
- Jovan Radonić (1873–1956), Austro-Hungarian-born Yugoslavian-Serbian historian and librarian
- Jovan Radonjić (1748–1803), Montenegrin noble and politician
- Jovan Radulović (1951–2018), Serbian writer, publicist, and library administrator
- Jovan Rajić (1726–1801), Habsburg Serbian writer, historian, theologian, traveller, geographer, and pedagogue
- Jovan Rašković (1929–1992), Serbian-Croatian psychiatrist, academic, and politician
- Jovan Rebula (born 1997), South African golfer
- Jovan Ristić (1831–1899), Serbian politician, diplomat, and historian
- Jovan Ružić (1898–1973), Serbian Yugoslavian footballer

=== S ===
- Jovan Šajnović (1924–2004), Serbian conductor, professor, and classical pianist
- Jovan Santos-Knox (born 1994), US-born Canadian football player
- Jovan Šarčević (1966–2015), Serbian footballer
- Jovan Savić (1772–1813), Serbian professor, bishop, diplomat, and politician
- Jovan Šević (died c. 1764), Habsburg and Russian Serbian general
- Jovan Simić Bobovac (1775–1832), Serbian politician, military commander, and revolutionary
- Jovan Skerlić (1877–1914), Serbian writer and literary critic
- Jovan Smith [see: J. Stalin] (born 1983), American songwriter, musician, and rapper
- Jovan Soldatović (1920–2005), Serbian sculptor
- Jovan Spasić (1909–1981), Yugoslavian footballer
- Jovan Stanković (born 1971), Serbian footballer
- Jovan Stanojković [see: Jovan Dovezenski (above)]
- Jovan Stefanović (born 1984), Serbian footballer
- Jovan Stejić (1803–1853), Habsburg Serbian physician, writer, philologist, and policy critic
- Jovan Sterija Popović (1806–1856), Serbian playwright, poet, lawyer, philosopher, and pedagogue
- Jovan Stojanović (born 1992), Serbian footballer
- Jovan Stojković [see: Jovan Babunski (above)]
- Jovan Stojoski (born 1997), Serbian-Macedonian sprinter
- Jovan Subotić (1817–1886), Serbian lawyer, writer, politician and academic
- Jovan Sundečić (1825–1900), Montenegrin Orthodox Christian priest, royal secretary, poet, and national anthem writer

=== T ===
- Jovan Talevski (born 1984), Macedonian handball player
- Jovan Talovac (fl. 1440–1461), Serbian-Hungarian noble
- Jovan Tanasijević (born 1998), Montenegrin footballer
- Jovan Tekelija (c. 1660 – c. 1721–22), Habsburg-Serbian noble and military leader
- Jovan the Serb (disambiguation), several people
- Jovan Tomić (1869–1932), Serbian historian and academic
- Jovan Tošković (1893–1943), Montenegrin Serbian historian, professor and politician
- Jovan Trifunoski (1914–1997), Serbian, Yugoslav and Macedonian geographer and anthropologist
- Jovan Trnić (born 1996), Serbian footballer

=== U ===
- Jovan Uglješa (a.k.a. Uglješa Mrnjavčević; fl. 1346–1371), Serbian noble, despot, and soldier
- Jovan Uroš (a.k.a. John Uroš; fl. c. 1370 – c. 1373; died 1422–23), Serbian despot of Thessaly

=== V ===
- Jovan Valenta (1826–1887), Serbian physician, surgeon, hospital manager, and politician
- Jovan Vasić (born 1987), Serbian footballer
- Jovan Vavic (born 1961/62), Yugoslavian-born American water polo coach
- Jovan Veselinov (1906–1982), Serbian prime minister
- Jovan Vićić (born 1997), Serbian footballer
- Jovan Vidović (born 1989), Slovenian footballer
- Jovan Vlalukin (born 1999), Serbian footballer
- Jovan Vladimir (c. 990 – 1016), Serbian monarch and saint
- Jovan Vraniškovski (born 1966), Macedonian cleric
- Jovan Vojinović (born 1998), Montenegrin basketball player
- Jovan Vučinić (born 1992), Montenegrin footballer

=== Z ===
- Jovan Zdravevski (born 1980), Macedonian-born Icelandic basketball player
- Jovan Zivlak (born 1947), Serbian poet, publisher, and essayist
- Jovan Zonjić (1907–1961), Serbian painter
- Jovan Zucović (born 1990), Serbian footballer
- Jovan Žujović (1856–1936), Serbian anthropologist, geologist, paleontologist, and craniometrist

== Fictional characters ==
- Jovan Myovic in the American TV series 24

== See also ==
- Jovan (disambiguation)
- Jovanka (disambiguation)
- Joven (disambiguation)
- Javon (disambiguation)
- Protopop Jovan (disambiguation)
- Ricky Javon Gray (1977–2017), American murderer
