= Jovan =

Jovan may refer to:

- Jovan (given name), a list of people with this given name
- Jovan, Mawal, a village on the western coastal region of Maharashtra, India
- Jōvan Musk, a cologne
- Deli Jovan, a mountain in eastern Serbia
- Róbert Jován (born 1967), Hungarian footballer

== See also ==
- Jovanka (disambiguation)
- Joven (disambiguation)
- Javon (disambiguation)
- Jovan Hill
