= Demming =

Demming is a surname. Notable people with the surname include:

- Alfons Demming (1928–2012), German Roman Catholic titular bishop
- Chantal Demming (born 1978), Dutch actress
- Ellen Demming (1922–2002), American actress
- Jevon Demming (born 1989), British Virgin Islands footballer
- Robert Demming (born 1947), English cricketer

== See also ==
- Demmings
- Deming (disambiguation)
