= Jovan Nikolić =

Jovan Nikolić may refer to:

- Jovan Nikolić (footballer, born 1991), Montenegrin football midfielder
- Jovan Nikolić (writer) (born 1955), Serbian Romani writer in Germany
- Jovan Nikolić (cartoonist) (born 1962), Serbian cartoonist
- Jovan Nikolić (priest) (died c.2000s), Serbian-Orthodox priest in Croatia
- Jovan Nikolić (footballer, born 2001), Botswanese football goalkeeper
