= Deming =

Deming may refer to:

== People ==
- Deming (surname)
- Deming (given name)

== Places ==
=== United States ===
- Deming, Indiana
- Deming, New Mexico
- Deming, Washington
- Deming Lake, a lake in Minnesota

== Other uses ==
- Deming Glacier (Washington), a glacier on Mount Baker
- Deming circle, an iterative management method
- Deming regression, a 2D regression method that accounts for errors in both variables
- Takming (德明), "Deming" in Cantonese pronunciation
  - Takming (constituency)
  - Takming University of Science and Technology, named in Sun Tak-ming (Sun Yat-sen's genealogical name), a private university in Taipei, Taiwan
  - Xihu metro station, where the deputy station name is Takming University, a metro station of the Taipei Metro
