= Jovon =

Jovon is a male given name. Notable people with the name include:

- Jovon Johnson (born 1983), Canadian football player
- Jovon Toppin (born 1989), Trinidadian sprinter

== See also ==
- Jevon
- Joven (disambiguation)
- Jovan (given name)
