= Jeavons =

Jeavons may refer to:

- Aaron Jeavons (born 1989), English cricketer
- Billy Jeavons (1912–1992), English footballer
- Colin Jeavons (born 1929), Welsh actor
- Enoch Jeavons (1893–1967), English cricketer
- Jean Jeavons (born 1956), British swimmer
- Nick Jeavons (born 1957), English rugby player

== See also ==
- Jeavons syndrome
- Re Jeavons, ex parte Mackay, insolvency law case
- Jevons (disambiguation)
- At Lady Molly's, 1957 novel by Anthony Powell
