= Demmings =

Demmings is a surname. Notable people with the surname include:

- Charles Demmings (born 2003), American football player
- Doug Demmings (1951–2002), American boxer

== See also ==
- Demings
- Demmin (surname)
- Demming
