= Demings =

Demings is a surname. Notable people with the surname include:

- Jerry Demings (born 1959), American law enforcement officer and politician, husband of Val
- Val Demings (born 1957), American law enforcement officer and politician

== See also ==
- Deming (surname)
- Demmings
