= Jovančić =

Jovančić (Serbian: Јованчић) is a Serbian patronymic surname derived from the given name Jovan. Notable people with the surname include:

- Dušan Jovančić (born 1990), Serbian footballer
- Milovan Jovančić (1929-2015), Serbian athlete and athletic coach
- Milutin Jovančić, Serbian rock musician
- Petko Jovančić (1942-2015), Serbian chef and culinary book writer
- Vladimir Jovančić (born 1987), Serbian footballer
