= Ajduković =

Ajduković (Cyrillic: Ајдуковић) is a surname. Notable people with the surname include:

- Duje Ajduković (born 2001), Croatian tennis player
- Jovan Ajduković (born 1968), Serbian linguist
- Tijana Ajduković (born 1991), Serbian basketballer
