= Zonjić =

Zonjić, Зоњић is a surname. Notable people with the surname include:

- Alexander Zonjic (born 1951), Canadian flutist
- Igor Zonjić (born 1991), Serbian-born Montenegrin footballer
- Jovan Zonjić (1907–1961), Serbian painter
- Tonči Zonjić (born 1986), Croatian comic artist
