= Deming Lake =

Lake in the state of Minnesota, United States

- Location within Minnesota
- Location: Itasca State Park, Hubbard County and Clearwater County, Minnesota
- Coordinates: 47°10′14″N 95°10′5″W
- Type: lake
- Etymology: Portius C. Deming
- Managing agency: Minnesota Department of Natural Resources
- Surface area: 0.05 km^{2} (0.019 sq mi)
- Max. depth: 17 m (56 ft)

Deming Lake is a lake in Hubbard County and Clearwater County, Minnesota, in the United States. It is within Itasca State Park.

== History ==
Deming Lake was initially named 'Danger Lake' by Peter Turnbull, a land surveyor and civil engineer from Canada, because of water "flooding the ice surface in winter at its south shore". It was renamed after Portius C. Deming, a state park official who was later the President of the Minneapolis Board of Park Commissioners.

== Natural history ==
Deming Lake is a meromictic lake. It has a relative depth of 6.7%. This is consistent with other meromictic lakes, whose relative depths generally exceed 4%.

Deming Lake is part of a tunnel valley drainage system within the Itasca Moraine consisting of three other lakes: Josephine Lake, Arco Lake, and Mary Lake. This system connects to the eastern arm of Lake Itasca.

Deming Lake has a turbidity maximum that persists across the lake basin at 5 m depth attributed to filamentous cyanobacteria of the genus Planktothrix. This feature shallows throughout the winter.

The varved sediments in Deming Lake are an archive of information about the Holocene. There was a relatively dry climate across central Minnesota during the early Holocene. This dry period was due to an insolation maximum over the North Hemisphere. Pollen cores taken from Deming Lake indicate that vegetation around the lake and within the Itasca region has changed in response to Holocene climate change. Pollen in the core was attributed to pine forest, grassland, and deciduous forest. The area was a prairie ecosystem from 8000 to 5400 years ago and transitioned to an Oak savannah ecosystem from 5400 to 3300 years ago. The area is currently a pine forest ecosystem.

== Recreation ==
Deming Lake is visible along its eastern shore from the South Entrance Road in Itasca State Park. The Ozawindib Trail runs along its western shore. The Okerson Heights Trail connects the Red Pine Trail to the Ozawindib Trail near Deming Lake. In the winter, both the South Entrance Road and the Ozawindib Trail are groomed for cross-country skiing.

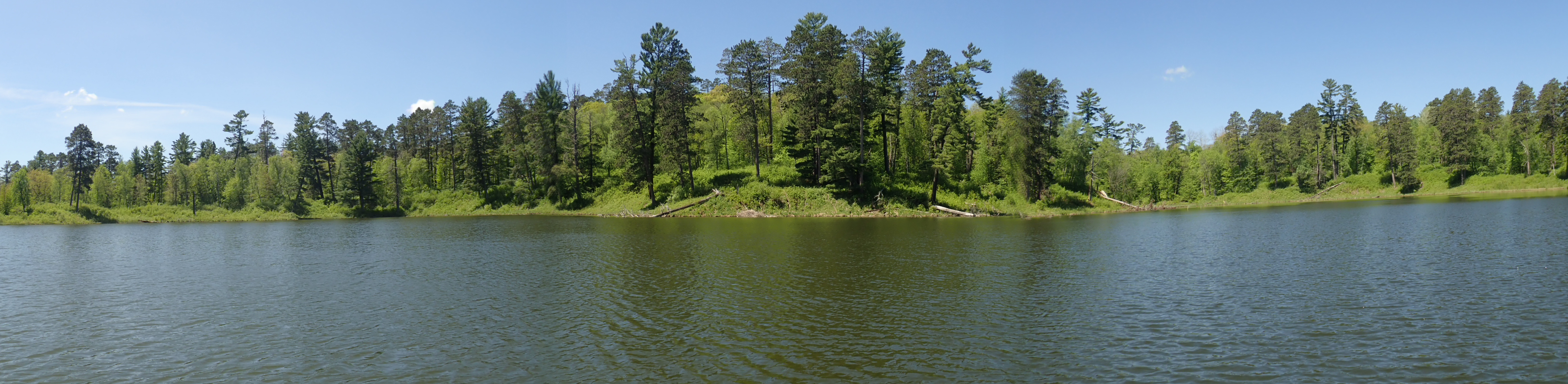
A panorama of Deming Lake in May 2020

== See also ==
- List of lakes in Minnesota
