= Deming (surname) =

Deming is a surname of English origin, and may refer to:

- Adelaide Deming, American artist
- Barbara Deming, American feminist
- Claiborne P. Deming, American businessman
- David Deming, American scientist and writer,
- Calvin Deming (1896-1963), American politician
- Edwin Willard Deming (1860–1942), artist
- John Deming, English colonial settler in Connecticut
- Laura Deming, American venture capitalist
- Lawson J. Deming, American radio and TV actor
- Martin Chester Deming, American businessman and politician
- Olcott Deming (1909–2007), American diplomat and ambassador
- Peter Deming, American cinematographer
- W. Edwards Deming, American statistician and quality expert
- William Deming (politician) (1833–1891), American politician and physician
