= Jovan Jovanović =

Jovan Jovanović may refer to:

- Jovan Jovanović (bishop) (1732–1805), Serbian Orthodox Bishop of Bačka
- Jovan Jovanović (film director) (1940–2022), Serbian film director
- Jovan Jovanović (politician) (born 1970), member of the National Assembly of Serbia, 2016-2020
- Jovan Jovanović (footballer) (born 1985), Serbian footballer
- Jovan Jovanović (rower) (born 1991), Serbian rower

== See also ==
- Jovan Jovanović Pižon (1869–1939), Serbian politician and diplomat
- Jovan Jovanović Zmaj (1833–1904), Serbian poet, writer, songwriter, and physician
