= Jevons =

Jevons may refer to:

== People ==
- Frank Byron Jevons (1858–1936), British academic and philosopher
- Frederic Jevons (1929–2012), academic
- Marshall Jevons, the name of a fictitious crime writer invented and used by William Breit and Kenneth G. Elzinga
- Phil Jevons (born 1979), English football player
- Reginald Jevons (1901–1981), British organist and composer
- William Stanley Jevons (1835–1882), English economist and logician

== Other ==
- Jevons paradox - an economic paradox where increased efficiency sometimes causes increased resource consumption.

== See also ==
- Jevon (disambiguation)
- Jevans
- Jeavons (disambiguation)
