= DeCost Smith =

American painter

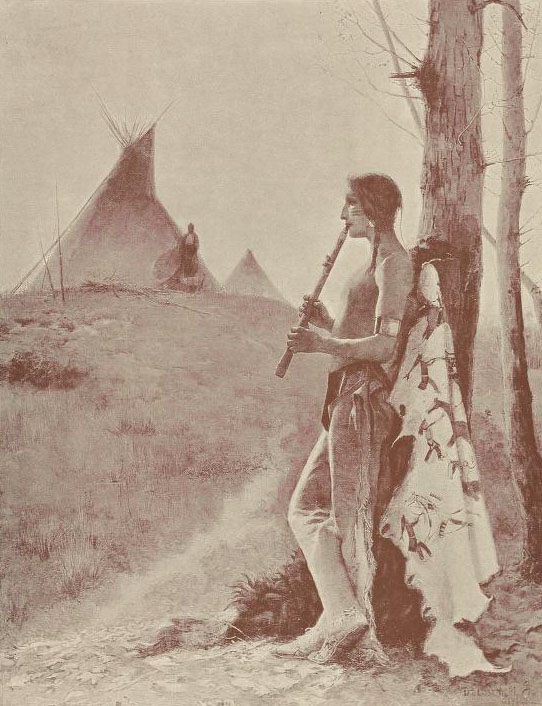
Engraving after Sioux lovers (circa 1887)

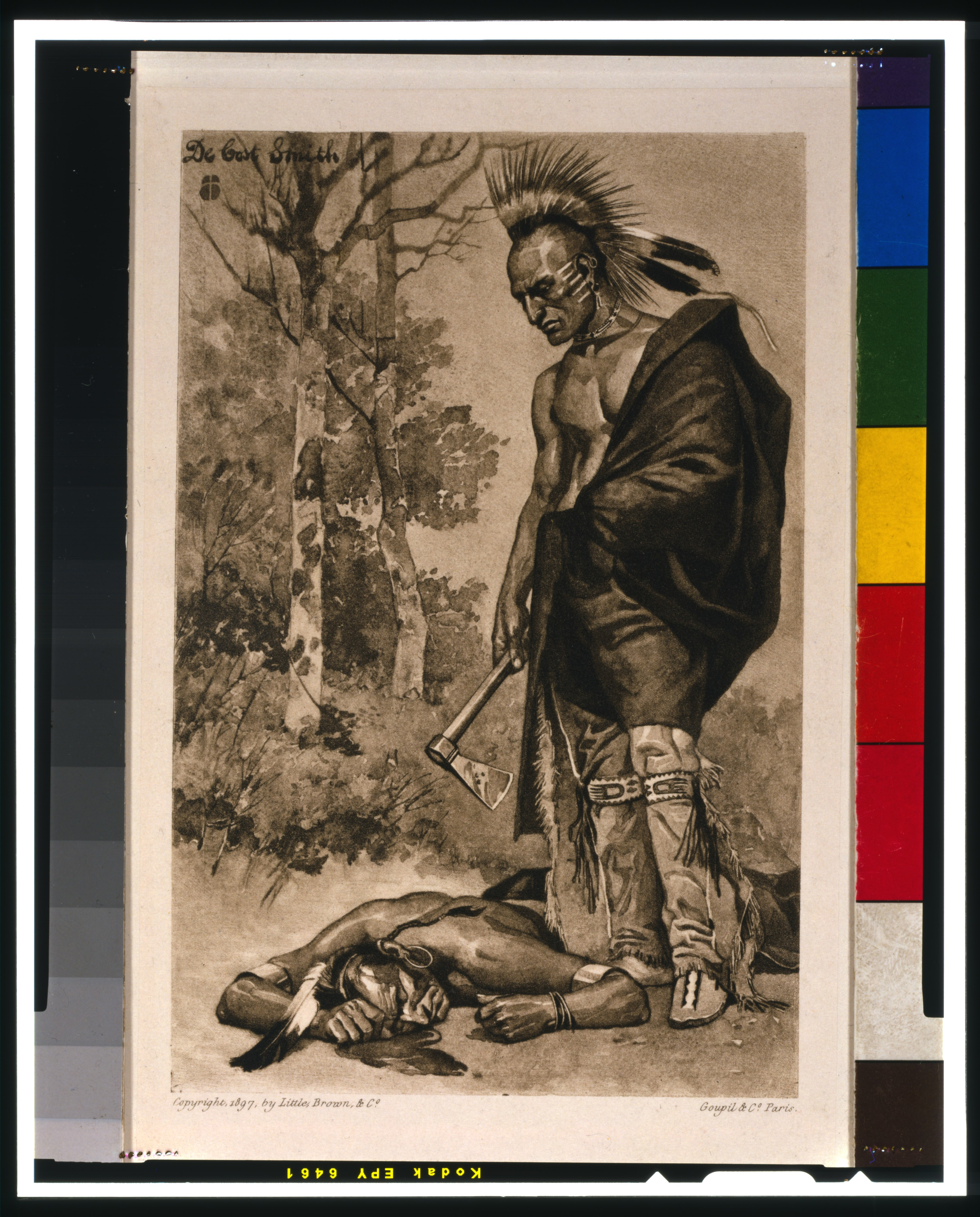
The death of Pontiac print published by Goupil & Cie from work owned by Little Brown & Co.

DeCost Smith, also written De Cost Smith, (1864–1939) was a painter, illustrator and writer in the United States who depicted scenes of native peoples and chronicled some of their activities. His collection of artifacts became part of the American Museum of Natural History and Smithsonian collections. Cornell University has a collection of his papers and other materials.

Smith was born in Skaneateles in Western New York state in 1864 to E. Reuel Smith (E.R.) and Elizabeth DeCost. His father inherited the Reuel E. Smith House. The home was not far from the Onondaga peoples reservation.

DeCost traveled west with his brother Leslie Smith in 1884. The next year he studied in Paris, exhibiting his painting "Conflicting Faiths" in 1889. It is now owned by the Skaneateles Library.

He worked with fellow artists Edwin Deming and Frederic Remington. Smith collected artifacts from the Sioux, Crow, and Onondaga Indians. He also wrote about the tribes and the encroachment they were experiencing. He served with the Bureau of Indian Affairs under various administrations including Theodore Roosevelt's. He met Sitting Bull, Tendoi, Rain-in-the-Face and other tribal leaders. Smith wrote two books about his expeditions and experiences.

In 1891 Smith was elected to the Salmagundi Club New York as an Artist member. He exhibited four times in the SCNY Annual Exhibition of Oil Paintings, 1889 to 1899, and five times in the SCNY Annual Exhibition and Auction Sale of Pictures, 1900 to 1905. In 1899 he was among the initial 24 artists to participate in the annual (until 1924) auction of Artists Ceramics Mugs, inaugurated to create a Library Fund.

He died in Amenia, New York in 1939, and is buried there with his wife Elizabeth Mills Smith, who died in 1930. They were childless.

== Bibliography ==
- Red Indian Experiences by DeCost Smith, Caxton Printers 1943
- Martyrs of the Oblong and the Little Nine Martyrs, about the tribe of Mohawks in the New York area and their decline
