= Reuel E. Smith House =

Historic house in New York, United States

- U.S. National Register of Historic Places
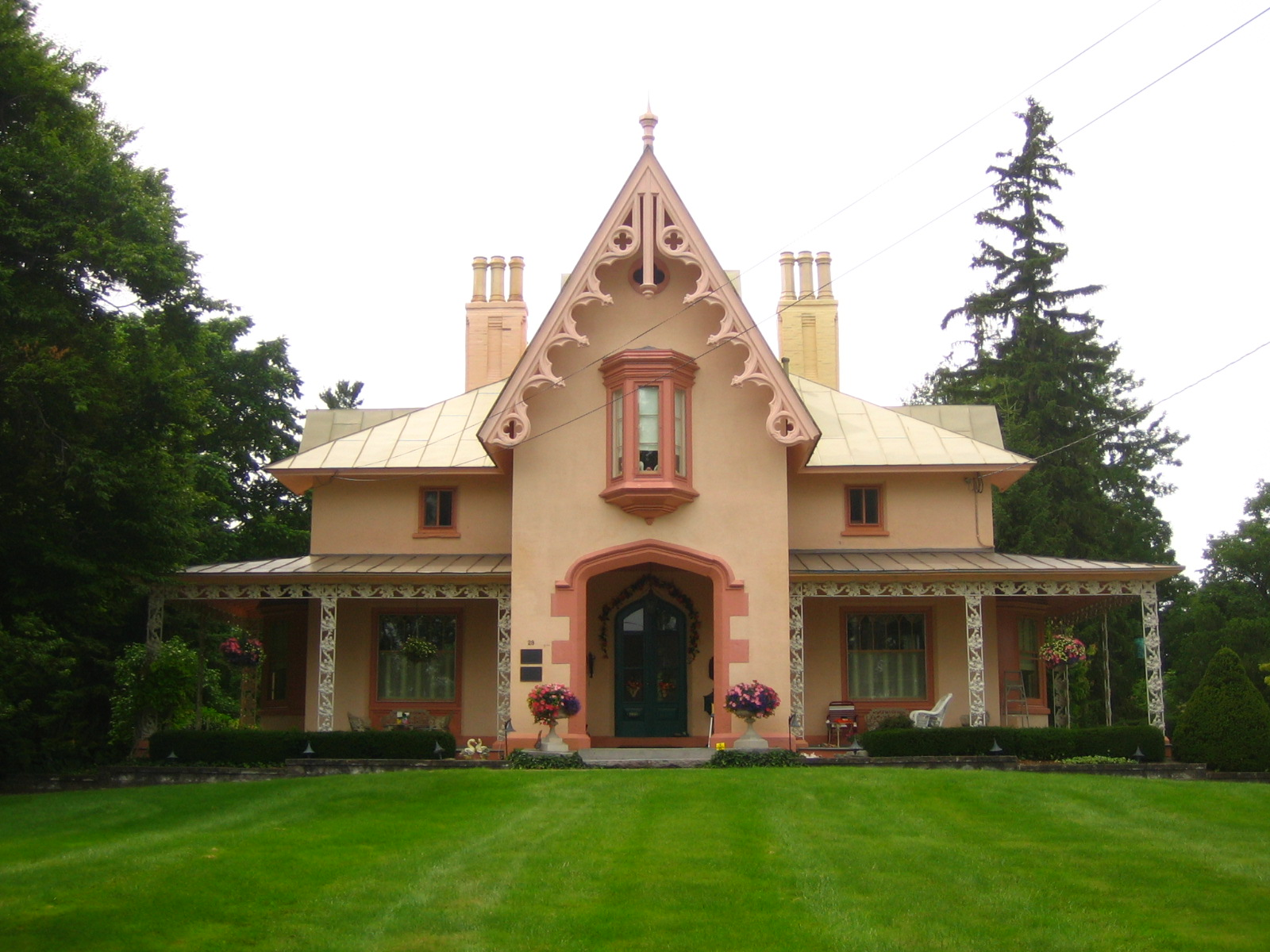
- The Reuel E. Smith house in 2009

- Location within New York Location within the United States
- Location: 28 West Lake Street; Skaneateles, New York
- Nearest city: Auburn, New York
- Coordinates: 42°56′34.4213″N 76°26′2.6581″W
- Built: 1848–1852
- Architect: Alexander Jackson Davis
- Additional Architect: Archimedes Russell
- Architectural style: Gothic Revival
- NRHP reference No.: 79001612
- Added to NRHP: July 27, 1979

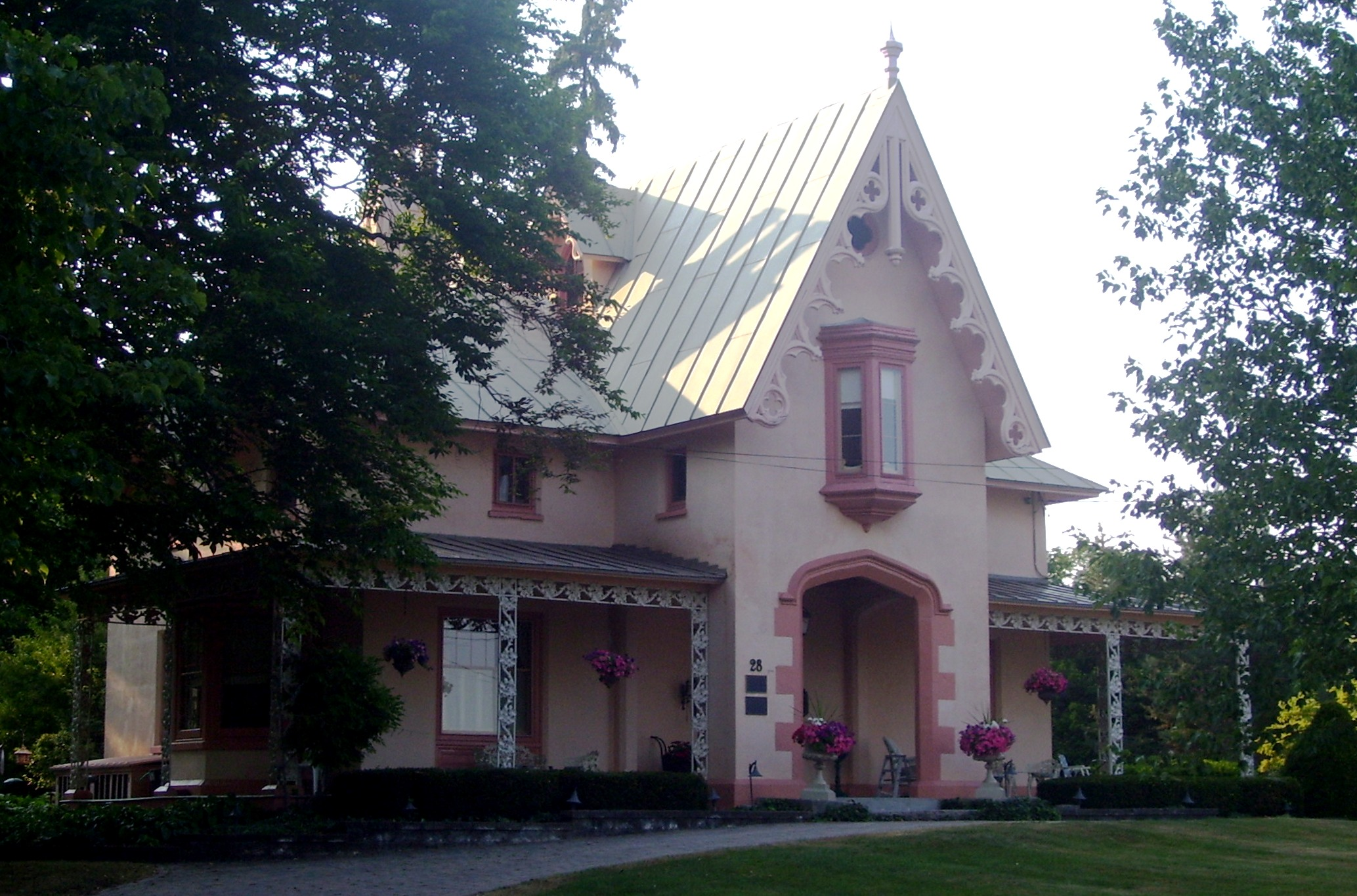
Photo of Smith House from 2012

The Reuel E. Smith House (also known as The Cove, The Gingerbread House, or Cobweb Cottage) located at 28 West Lake Street in Skaneateles, New York is a picturesque house designed by Alexander Jackson Davis, and later modified by Archimedes Russell. It was built during 1848–1852 and is a "good example of the Gothic Revival mode, which was a reaction against the stringencies of the Greek Revival style" as exemplified by the nearby Richard DeZeng House. It is the only house designed by Davis in Onondaga County that has survived since the demolition of the Charles Sedgewick Cottage on James Street in Syracuse.

The house was photographed by Historic American Buildings Survey photographer Jack Boucher in 1962. It was listed on the National Register of Historic Places in 1979. It has been portrayed in several artworks.

In 1979, State Commissioner of Parks and Recreation Orin Lehman said that the Reuel E. Smith House "embodies some of the major currents of mid-nineteenth century thought in literature and art as well as architecture."

In 1981, the Reuel E. Smith House received a federal Heritage Conservation and Recreation Service grant for restoration of the pink stucco exterior, the roof, and the chimneys, which described the home as "an excellent example of Gothic revival style" with "considerable intrinsic merit."

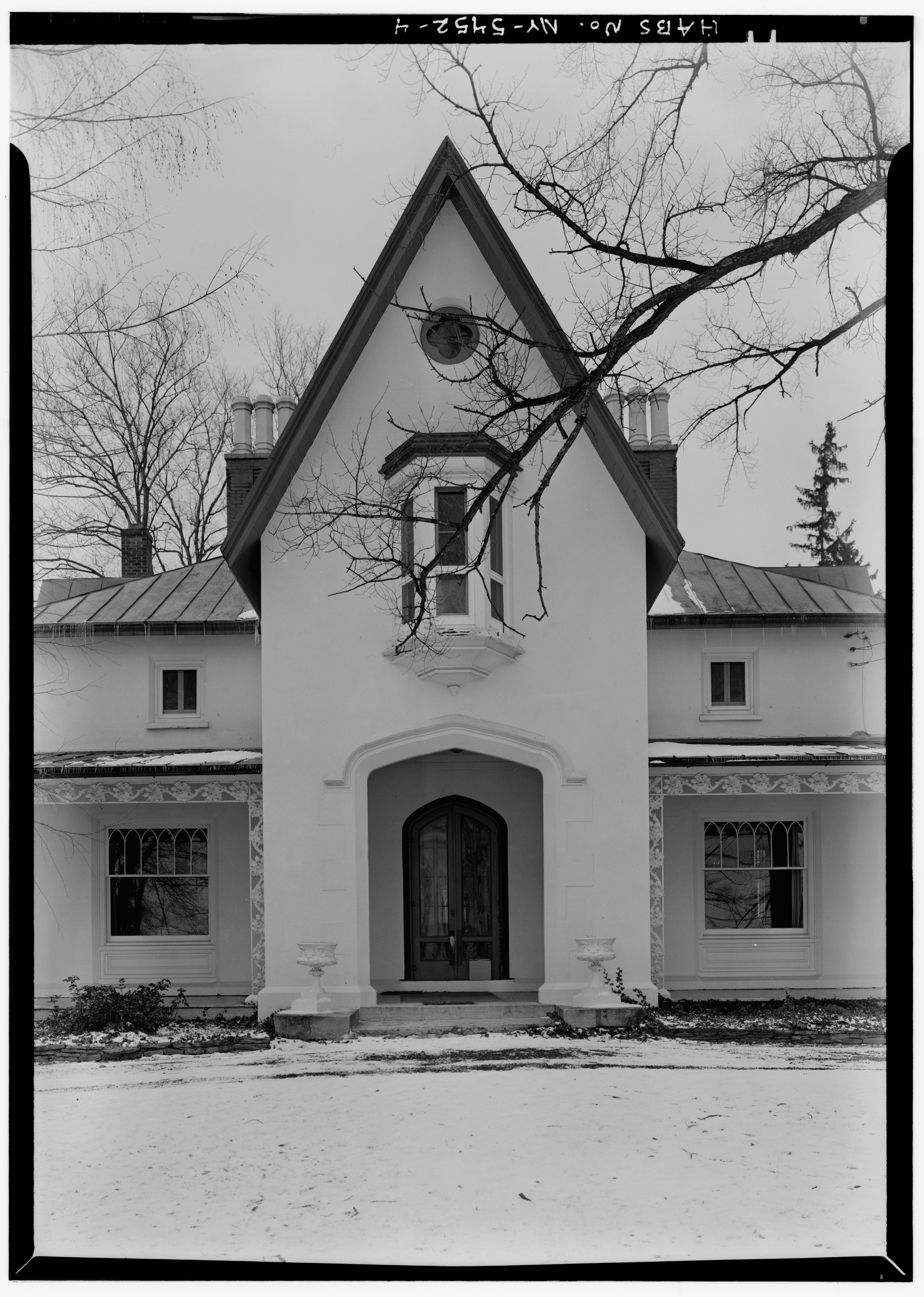
Historic American Buildings Survey photograph of the "East Front" (1962)

The home was built for Reuel Smith, partner in a New York City shipping firm. His son E. Reuel Smith inherited the estate. "E.R.", as he was called, was a prominent figure in the village having married into Skaneateles "royalty", his wife being Elizabeth DeCost. (Elizabeth DeCost's great-grandfather was William J. Vredenburg, one of the earliest settlers of Skaneateles.) E.R. died at the home in 1911. Their son, DeCost Smith, noted painter of the American West, was born at the Reuel Smith House. Reuel's grandson Sedgwick married Elsa Watts Smith, who in 1975 sold the property to Robert & Shirley Feldmann. The Feldmanns sold the property in April 2017. The current owners of the home are Justin and Dr. Rebecca West Reeves.

== Architecture ==
The home is constructed of brick covered with stucco, and originally sat upon an estate of approximately 20 acres. The stucco has been painted several times over the years. As of 2009, the exterior was a pink tone with a darker salmon color applied to the bargeboards (sometimes called "gingerbread" or vergeboard). As of 2019, the exterior was a gold tone with off-white applied to the bargeboards. As detailed in the National Register of Historic Places Inventory, the fenestration (window design and placement) is largely symmetrical, typical of the architectural style, and includes a central protruding oriel window on the second floor on the east front. Above this oriel window is an oculus with quatrefoil wooden tracery. The main entry is a four-centred arch flanked by sandstone labels painted off-white to match the ornamentation of the bargeboards. The first floor is largely encircled by a porch, which is adorned with iron ornamentation in the form of oak leaves and acorns. The large picture window on the north side of the structure, now looking out from the current kitchen, was added in 1926 by Archimedes Russell. The bargeboards were removed in 1940, but later replaced. The floors, originally pine, were replaced in 1941 with walnut. The interior walls – brick covered with plaster – are ten inches thick. Fireplaces with white marble mantels are original on both floors.

== Alexander Jackson Davis ==
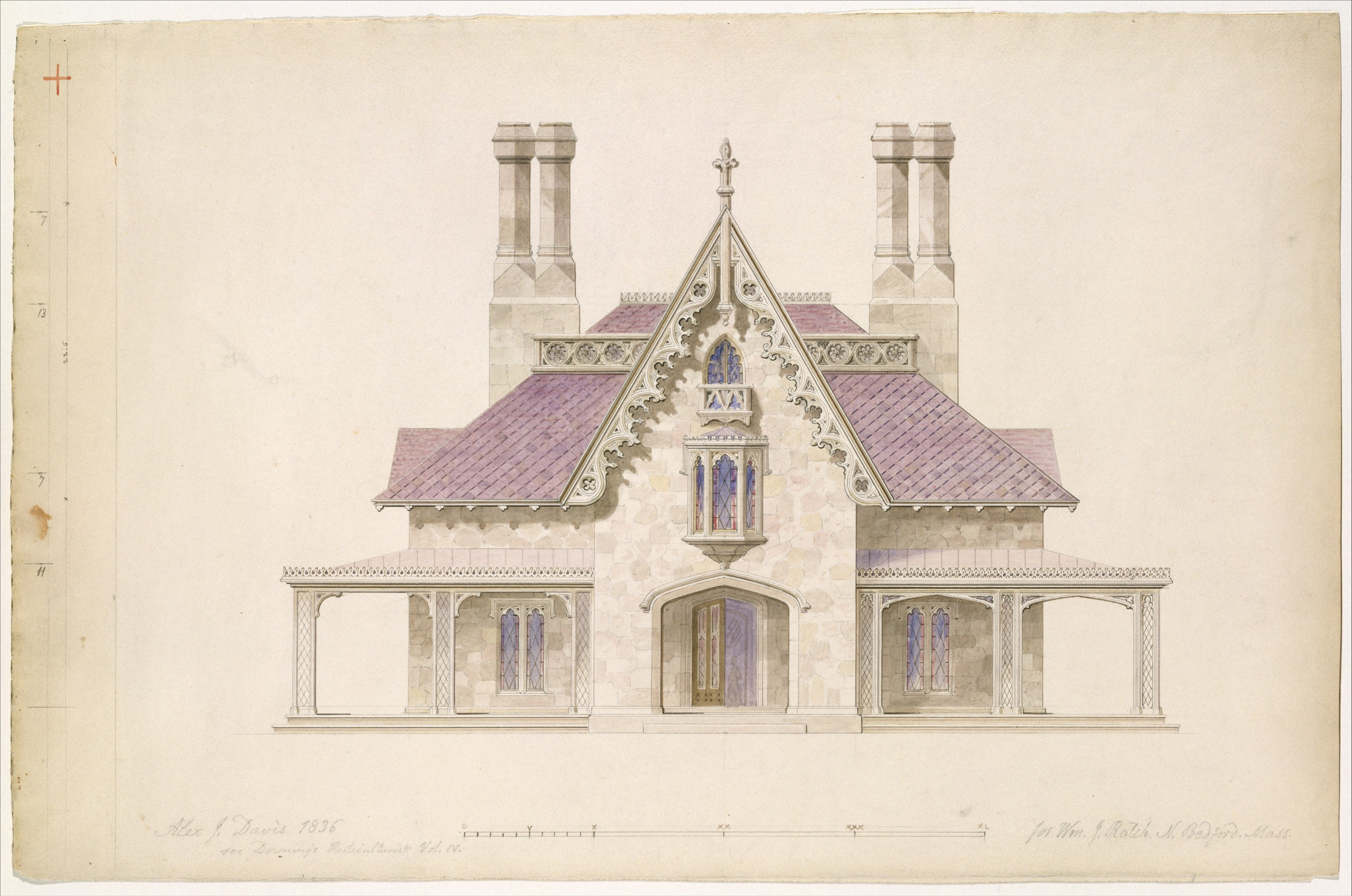
Front elevation plan for a nearly identical house designed by Davis for William J. Rotch, New Bedford, Massachusetts (1845). The house design was published in a book by Davis.

Named by The Metropolitan Museum of Art as one of America's most notable architects, Alexander Jackson Davis's career peaked in the 1840s and 1850s, during the design of this home. Davis is admired as the preeminent designer of "country" homes. His approach to Gothic Revival was something prominent Americans sought out and cherished, from Samuel F. B. Morse and Jay Gould to successful merchants like Reuel Smith. While others of his era were building box houses, Alexander Jackson Davis pushed boundaries. His homes incorporated peaks, extensions in many directions, unique windows, and verandas, all of which can be found in the Reuel E. Smith House. Davis's unique decorative style has adorned landscapes across the Northeast and the Hudson River Valley. Many of the homes he designed have been demolished.

Davis was a friend of American landscape designer and Gothic Revival advocate Andrew Jackson Downing, who likely influenced Davis's design of the Reuel E. Smith house, including its interior design.

== See also ==
- National Register of Historic Places listings in Onondaga County, New York
- "Edmond Reuel Smith" on Wikipedia in German
- James Reuel Smith
