= Jevans =

Jevans is a surname. Notable people with the surname include:

- John Jevans (by 1525–1565), English politician

== See also ==
- Jevons
