= Jevon =

Jevon is a given name. Notable people with the name include:

- Jevon Atkinson, swimmer
- Jevon Carter (born 1995), American basketball player
- Jevon Crudup, basketball player
- Jevon Demming (born 1989), football player
- Jevon Groves, rugby union player
- Jevon Holland (born 2000), Canadian-American football player
- Jevon Jones (born 1973), American rapper
- Jevon Kearse (born 1976), football player
- Jevon Langford (born 1974), football player
- Jevon Tarantino (born 1984), springboard diver

Notable people with the surname include:

- Rachel Jevon (bapt. 1627), English poet
- Thomas Jevon (1652–1688), English playwright

== See also ==
- Jevan Snead (born 1987), football player
- Javon, given name
- Jevons
