= Protopop Jovan =

Protopop Jovan (Serbian Cyrillic: Протопоп Јован) is the Serbian-language rendition of "Protopope John". It may refer to:

- Jovan the Serb of Kratovo (1526–1583), Serbian Orthodox priest and scribe with an opus of six works, of which one is the Velika Remeta Gospel (1580)
- Jovan Pavlović (?), Serbian Orthodox priest of Šabac

== See also ==
- Jovan (given name)
- Protopop
