= Javon =

Javon may refer to:

== Notable people with the given name "Javon" ==
- Javon Baker (born 2002), American football player
- Javon Bullard (born 2002), American football player
- Javon East (born 1995), Jamaican footballer
- Javon Foster (born 2000), American football player
- Javon Francis (born 1994), Jamaican sprinter
- Javon Freeman-Liberty (born 1999), American basketball player
- Javon Hagan (born 1997), American football player
- Javon Hargrave (born 1993), American football player
- Javon Jackson (born 1965), American saxophonist
- Javon Kinlaw (born 1997), American football player
- Javon Leake (born 1998), American football player
- Javon McCrea (born 1992), American basketball player
- Javon McKinley (born 1998), American football player
- Javon Patterson (born 1997), American football player
- Javon Ringer (born 1987), American football player
- Javon Rolland-Jones (born 1994), American football player
- Javon Searles (born 1986), Barbadian cricketer
- Javon Small (born 2002), American basketball player
- Javon Solomon (born 2001), American football player
- Javon Tracy (born 2003), American football player
- Javon Walker (born 1978), American football player
- Javon Walton (born 2006), American actor and boxer
- Javon Wims (born 1994), American football player

== See also ==
- Folco de Baroncelli-Javon (1869–1943), French writer and cattle farmer
- Jevon, people with the given name "Jevon"
- Javan (disambiguation), a disambiguation page for "Javan"
- Jovan (given name), people with the given name "Jovan"
- Joven (disambiguation), a disambiguation page for "Joven"
