= Demmin (disambiguation) =

Demmin may refer to:

== Places ==
- Demmin, town in Mecklenburg-Western Pomerania, Germany
- Demmin (district), Mecklenburg-Western Pomerania, Germany
- Duchy of Demmin, one of the partitions of the Duchy of Pomerania

== People ==
- Demmin (surname)
- Casimir I of Demmin, also known as Casimir I, Duke of Pomerania
- Casimir II of Demmin, also known as Casimir II, Duke of Pomerania
- Hans Joachim von Rohr-Demmin (1888-1971), German politician
- Wartislaw III of Demmin, also known as Wartislaw III, Duke of Pomerania
