= Ajivali =

Village in Maharashtra

- Village
- Location in Maharashtra, India Ajivali (India)
- Coordinates: 18.9558751°N 73.1595452°E
- Country: India
- State: Maharashtra
- District: Raigad
- Tehsil: Panvel

Government
  - Type: Panchayati Raj
  - Body: Gram panchayat

Area
  - Total: 469 ha (1,160 acres)

Population (2011)
  - Total: 632
  - Density: 135/km^{2} (349/sq mi)
- Sex ratio 302/330 ♂/♀

Languages
  - Official: Marathi
  - Other spoken: Marathi
- Time zone: UTC+5:30 (IST)
- Pin code: 410221
- Telephone code: 02114
- ISO 3166 code: IN-MH
- Vehicle registration: MH-46
- Website: pune.nic.in

Ajivali is a village and gram panchayat in India, situated in Panvel taluka of Raigad district in the state of Maharashtra. It encompasses an area of 469 ha (1,159 acres).

== Administration ==
The village is administrated by a sarpanch, an elected representative who leads a gram panchayat. At the time of the 2011 Census of India, the village was the headquarters for the eponymous gram panchayat, which also governed the village of Jovan.

== Demographics ==
At the 2011 census, the village comprised 125 households. The population of 632 was split between 302 males and 330 females.

== See also ==
- List of villages in Mawal taluka
