= Jovan Mandil =

Jovan Mandil (Serbian Cyrillic: Јован Мандил; 1873–1916) was a Serbian Jewish lawyer and publicist active in the Balkan Wars and World War I. Mandil was born in the town of Šabac in 1873. He was the son of Benjamin Mandil. In 1912, the Royal Serbian Government dispatched him to Monastir (modern-day Bitola; Serbian: Bitolj), in southern Macedonia, where the region's most populous Sephardic Jewish community was centered. He arrived in the town immediately after its capture by the Royal Serbian Army. Mandil soon established a law office. He also delivered lectures at the town's Academy of Commerce. He promoted the Serbian cause among local Jews, who had suddenly found themselves cut off from Thessaloniki, their traditional religious, cultural and economic centre. Mandil communicated with members of the local Jewish community in their traditional tongue, Judeo-Spanish (also known as Ladino). Mandil also established the town's first Serbian-language newspaper, Bitoljske novine (The Bitolj News). He appointed himself as the newspaper's editor-in-chief and wrote most of its articles.

In 1916, Mandil was among the founders of the newspaper Velika Srbija (Greater Serbia), the official organ of the Serbian government-in-exile. The newspaper was published in Thessaloniki, and appeared in print between 1916 and 1918. Mandil died in the Greek port city of Volos in 1916.
