= Mary Lake (Clearwater and Hubbard counties, Minnesota) =

Lake in the state of Minnesota, United States

- Location within Minnesota
- Location: Clearwater County, Minnesota
- Coordinates: 47°11′7″N 95°10′2″W
- Type: lake

Mary Lake is a lake in Clearwater County and Hubbard County, Minnesota, in the United States.

Mary Lake was named for Mary Turnbull, the wife of a government surveyor.

== See also ==
- List of lakes in Minnesota
