= Jovan Popović =

Jovan Popović may refer to:

- Jovan Popović (Baroque painter), 18th-century Serbian Baroque painter
- Jovan Popović (painter) (1810–1864), Serbian portrait painter
- Jovan Popović (rower) (born 1987), Serbian rower
- Jovan Popović (writer) (1905–1952), Serbian writer, poet, and Yugoslav partisan
- Jovan Sterija Popović (1806–1856), Serbian playwright, poet, lawyer, philosopher, and pedagogue
