= Lake Josephine (Ramsey County, Minnesota) =

Lake in the state of Minnesota, United States

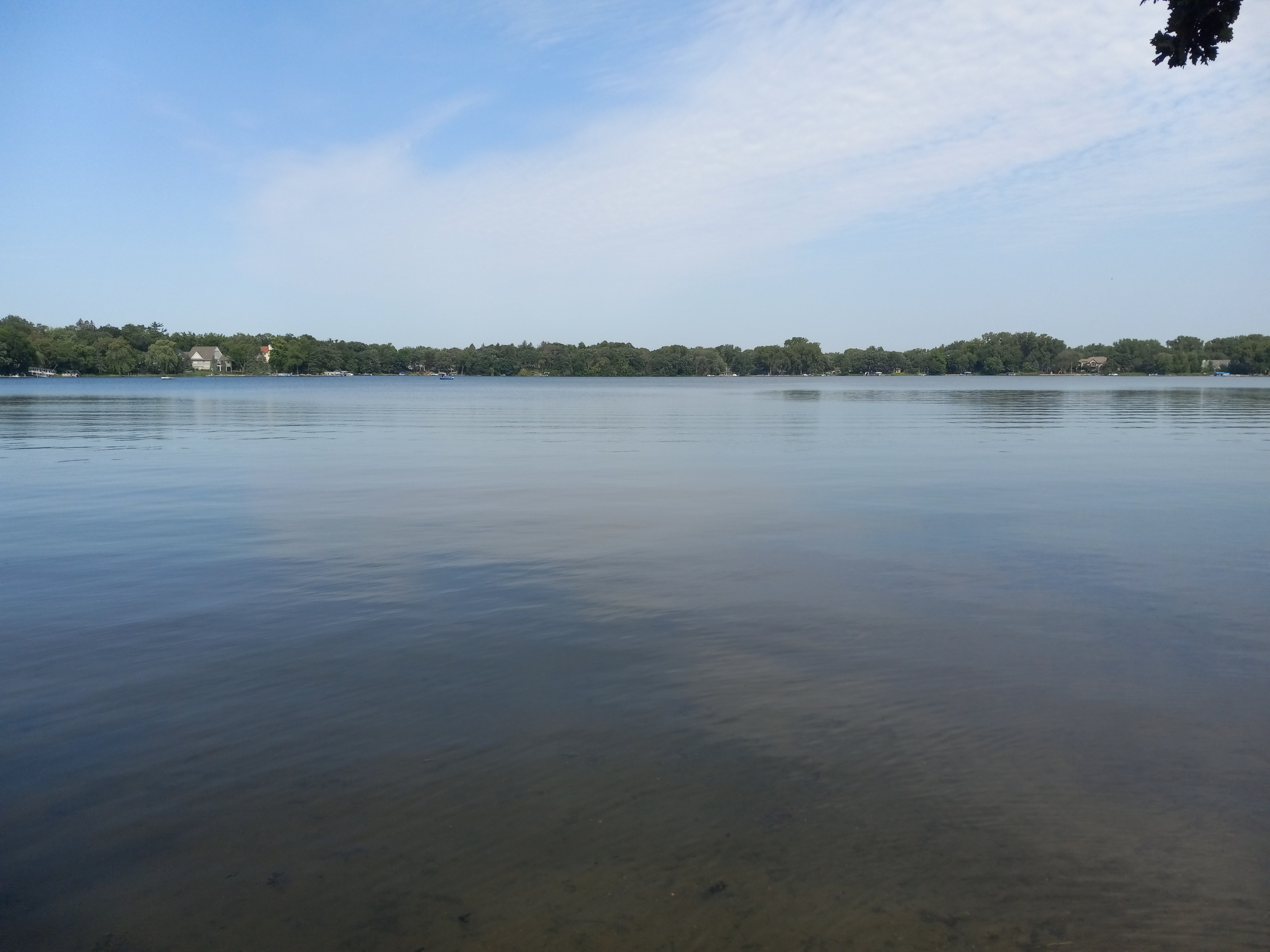

- Location within Minnesota
- Location: Ramsey County, Minnesota
- Coordinates: 45°2′9″N 93°9′12″W
- Type: lake

Lake Josephine is a lake in Ramsey County, in the U.S. state of Minnesota and was named for Josephine McKenty, an early settler. It surrounds suburban neighborhoods in Arden Hills and Roseville. A park was built that around the lake that serves as a recreational hub for swimming, fishing, picnicking, and boating through

== See also ==
- List of lakes in Minnesota
