= Calvin Deming =

American politician and businessman

Calvin Deming (June 28, 1896 – September 17, 1963) was an American politician and businessman.

Deming was born in Minneapolis, Minnesota and went to the Minneapolis public schools. He served in the United States Army during World War I. Deming went to Carleton College. He lived in Minneapolis with his wife and family and was in the real estate business. Deming served in the Minnesota House of Representatives from 1927 to 1930. His father Portius C. Deming also served in the Minnesota House of Representatives. He then lived in Grinnell, Iowa and was the director of admissions at Grinnell College. He died at his home in Arcadia, California.
