= Jovan Jovanović (rower) =

Serbian rower

Medal record

Representing Serbia

U23 World Championship
Gold medal – first place	2011 Amsterdam	Coxed four
Gold medal – first place	2012 Trakai	Coxed four

Jovan Jovanović (Serbian: Јован Јовановић; born 11 October 1991) is a Serbian rower.

Jovanović was born in 1991 in Smederevo. His parents are Slobodan and Svetlana Jovanović. He won a gold medal at the 2011 World Rowing U23 Championships in men's coxed four and posted a U23 world record. He repeated the success in 2012. Currently, Jovan is coaching at Oakland Strokes.
