= Jovan Džiknić =

Serbian footballer

Personal information
- Full name: Jovan Džiknić
- Date of birth: 26 April 1989 (age 37)
- Place of birth: Belgrade, SFR Yugoslavia
- Height: 1.90 m (6 ft 3 in)
- Position: Centre forward

Team information
- Current team: Sopot

Senior career*
Years	Team	Apps	(Gls)
2008–2012	Čukarički	50	(2)
2012–2014	Dorćol		
2014–2015	Hajduk Beograd		
2015	Sopot		(9)
2016	Bežanija	0	(0)
2016	Sopot	0	(0)
2017	Radnički Nova Pazova	0	(0)
2017–	Sremac	0	(0)
- * Club domestic league appearances and goals as of 2 August 2016

Jovan Džiknić (Serbian Cyrillic: Јован Џикнић; born 26 April 1989) is a Serbian football forward who plays for Sremac.

Džiknić made over 50 caps playing for Čukarički in the Serbian SuperLiga and Serbian First League. Later he was with Dorćol and Hajduk Beograd. As the best scorer of Sopot in the first half-season with 9 goals in 2015–16 Serbian League Belgrade, Džiknić moved in Bežanija in the winter break off-season. After a half-season without caps for Bežanija, Džiknić returned to Sopot in summer 2016.
