= Joven =

Joven may refer to:

== Tequila ==
- Joven (tequila), a type of tequila

== Given names ==
- Joven Clarke (born 1983), Australian former rugby league footballer
- Joven Alba, participated in Billiards and snooker at the 2005 Southeast Asian Games
- Joven Bustamante, participated in 2007 WPA Men's World Nine-ball Championship
- Joven Bedic, participated in 2011 PFF National Men's U-23 Championship
- Joven Benitez, participated in 2015 UFL Cup
- Joven E. Rola, actor in The Eve of St. Mark
- Joven Yuson, in Manila local elections, 2010

== Surname ==
- Chris Joven, participated in 2011–12 UCI Asia Tour
- Ceferino Jóven, Governor of Pampanga
- Francis Joven, participated in Boxing at the 2006 Asian Games – Men's 69 kg

== See also ==
- Jovon, given name
- Jovan (given name)
