= Jovan Nikolić (footballer, born 2001) =

Motswana footballer (born 2001)

Personal information
- Date of birth: 9 September 2001 (age 25)
- Place of birth: Gaborone, Botswana
- Position: Goalkeeper

Team information
- Current team: AC Marinhense
- Number: 1

Senior career*
Years	Team	Apps	(Gls)
–2021	FK Zemun		
2022	FK Vinča		
2022	FK Crvena zvezda Mali Mokri Lug		
2022–2023	FK Sinđelić Beograd		
2024–	AC Marinhense		

International career
- Botswana
- * Club domestic league appearances and goals

Jovan Nikolić (born 9 September 2001) is a Motswana footballer who plays as a goalkeeper for AC Marinhense.

== Early life ==
He was born in 2001 in Botswana. He moved to South Africa as a child.

== Club career ==
In 2022, he signed for Serbian side FK Sinđelić Beograd. In 2024, he signed for Portuguese side AC Marinhense.

== International career ==
He is a Botswana international. He played for the Botswana national under-20 football team at the 2019 COSAFA U-20 Cup.

== Personal life ==
Born in Botswana, Nikolić is of Serbian descent, and holds dual citizenship. He can speak four languages.
