= Jovan Nikolić (cartoonist) =

Serbian cartoonist

Jovan Nikolić (Belgrade, 29 January 1962) is a Serbian cartoonist.

He studied at law school and had his first cartoons published in "The Student", "NON", "South Comics" and since 1985 only in "YU strip." Most his works were realized in collaboration with writer Vojislav Psončak under the pseudonyms Ano & Nep (Serbian Cyrillic Ано & Неп).

== See also ==
- sr:Ано & Неп, article on the comic on Serbian Wikipedia.
