= Edwin Willard Deming =

American painter, sculptor (1860–1942)

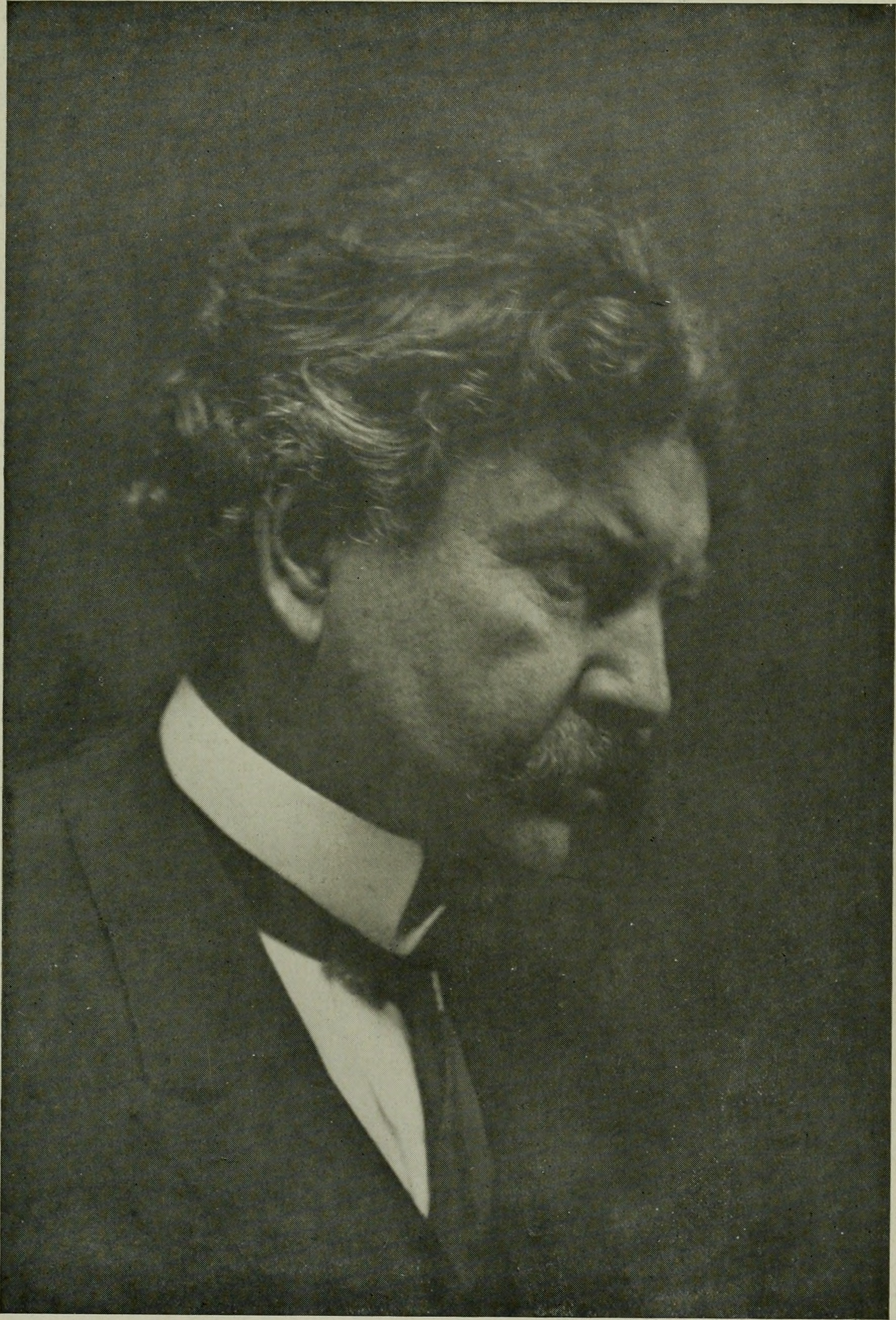
- Born: August 26, 1860; Ashland, Ohio, United States
- Died: October 15, 1942 (aged 82); New York City, New York, United States
- Other names: E. W. Deming, Man-Afraid-of-His-Name, Eight Bears
- Education: Art Students League of New York, Académie Julian
- Occupations: Painter, sculptor, illustrator, muralist
- Spouse: Therese Osterheld (m. 1892–)
- Children: 6

Edwin Willard Deming (August 26, 1860 – 1942) was an American visual artist and illustrator, who was known for his genre paintings of indigenous tribe members (particularly of the Blackfeet tribe) and wild animals. He worked as a painter, muralist, illustrator, and sculptor. One of his murals was adapted for use on U.S. postage. Deming was also known as E. W. Deming, Man-Afraid-of-His-Name, and Eight Bears.

== Life and career ==
Edwin Willard Deming was born on August 26, 1860, in Ashland, Ohio, to parents Celestina Velutina (née Willard) and Howard Deming. As a child, his family moved due to the American Civil War, and he was raised in Geneseo, Illinois, where on occasion they were neighbors with the Winnebago people. When he was a teenager, he traveled in Oklahoma, and sketched indigenous people.

Deming studied at the Art Students League of New York; followed by study from 1884 to 1885 at the Académie Julian in Paris, under Gustave Boulanger and Jules Joseph Lefebvre.

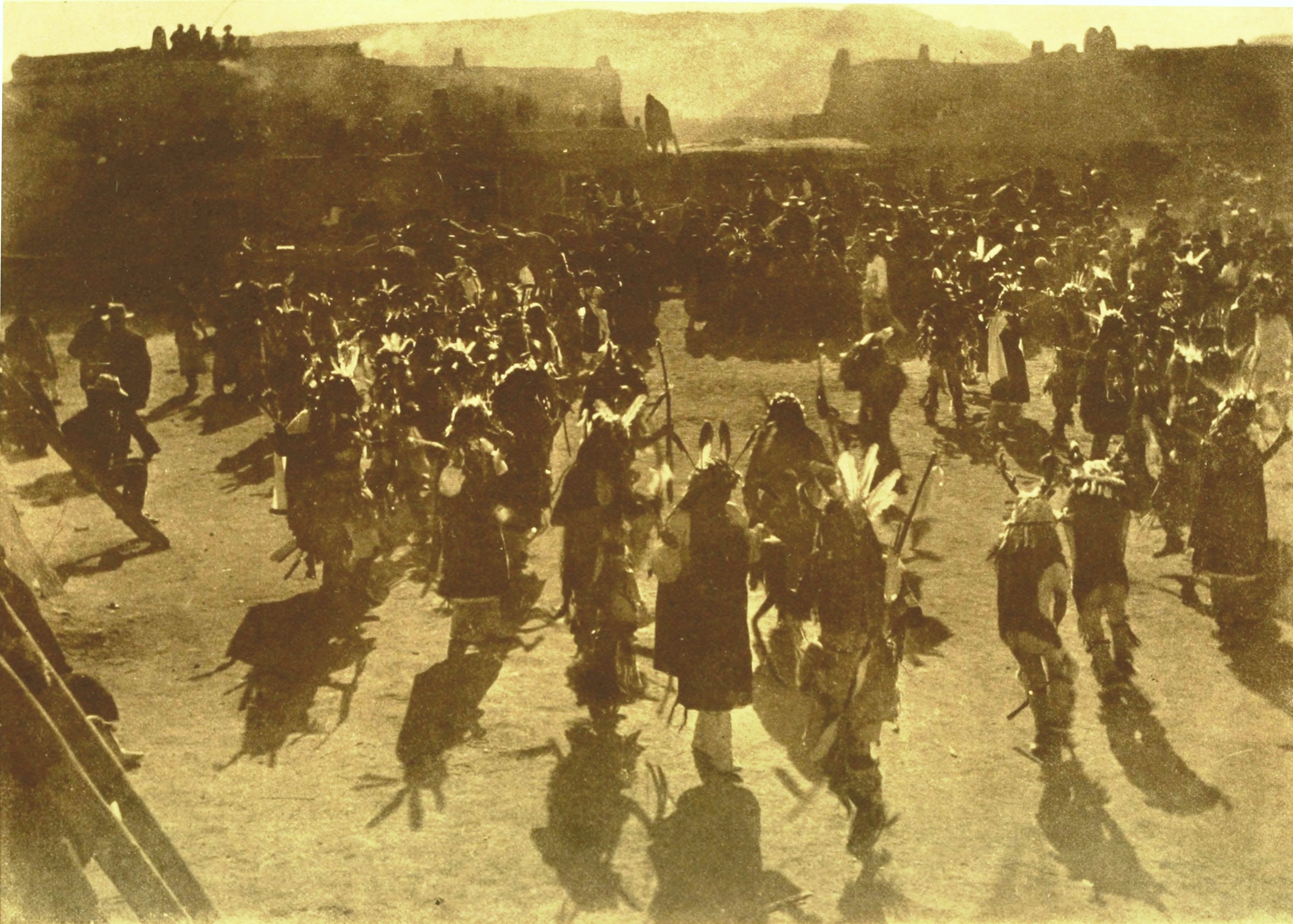
photograph by Deming of the buffalo dance at San Ildefonso, New Mexico (1893)

When he returned to the United States, he worked for the next two years painting cycloramas, which are panoramic paintings on the inside of a cylindrical canvas.

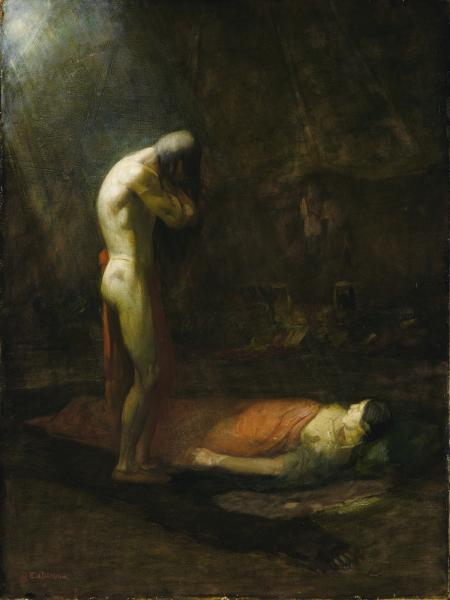
Mourning Brave (circa 1892) by Edwin Willard Deming

Deming traveled with fellow artist DeCost Smith in 1890. His artwork took him to Arizona and New Mexico, as well as to the tribal lands of the Blackfeet, Crow, and Sioux.

In 1892, he married Therese Osterheld from Yonkers, New York, and together they had six children.

He died on October 15, 1942, in New York City.

== Gallery ==
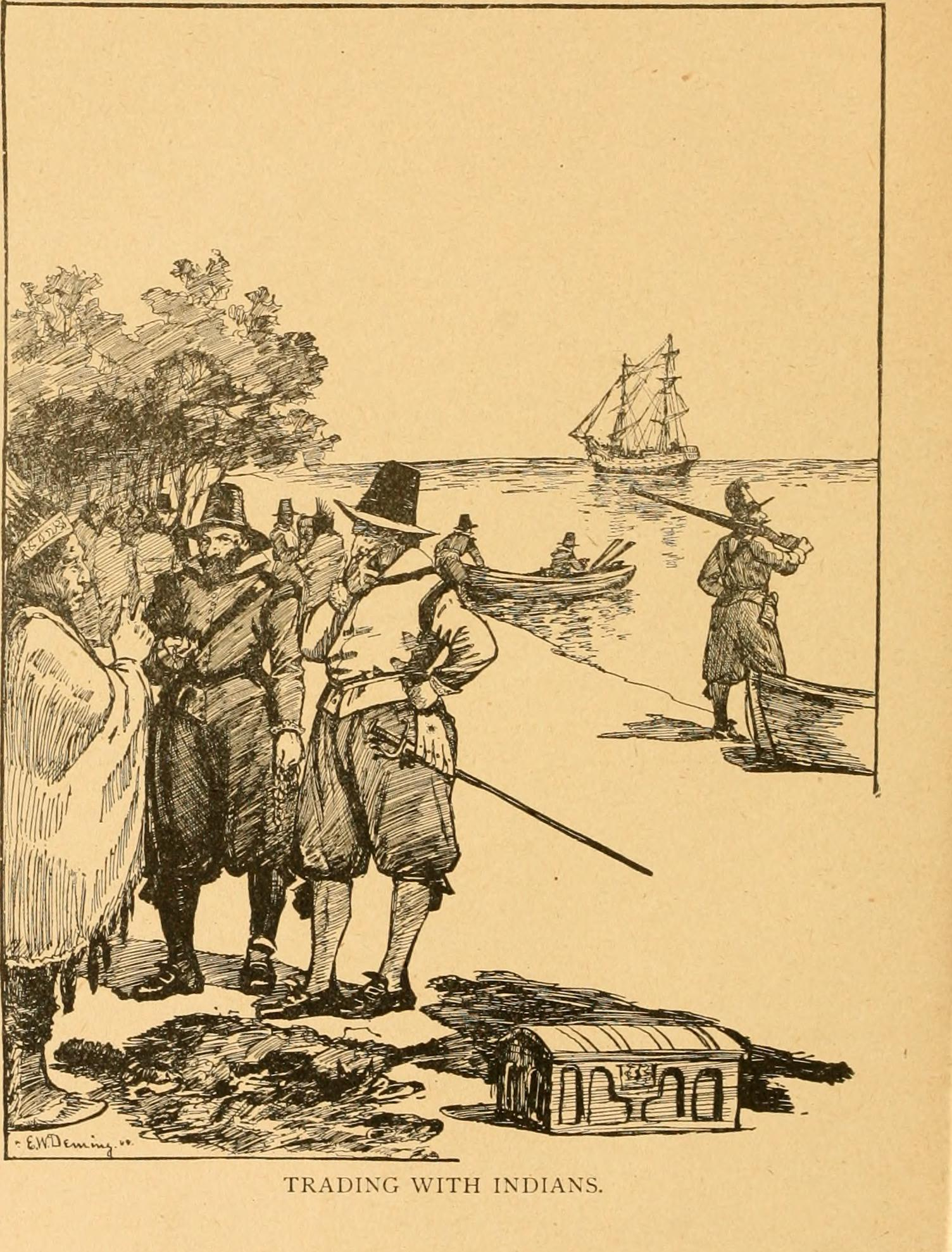
Trading with Indians (1898), etching

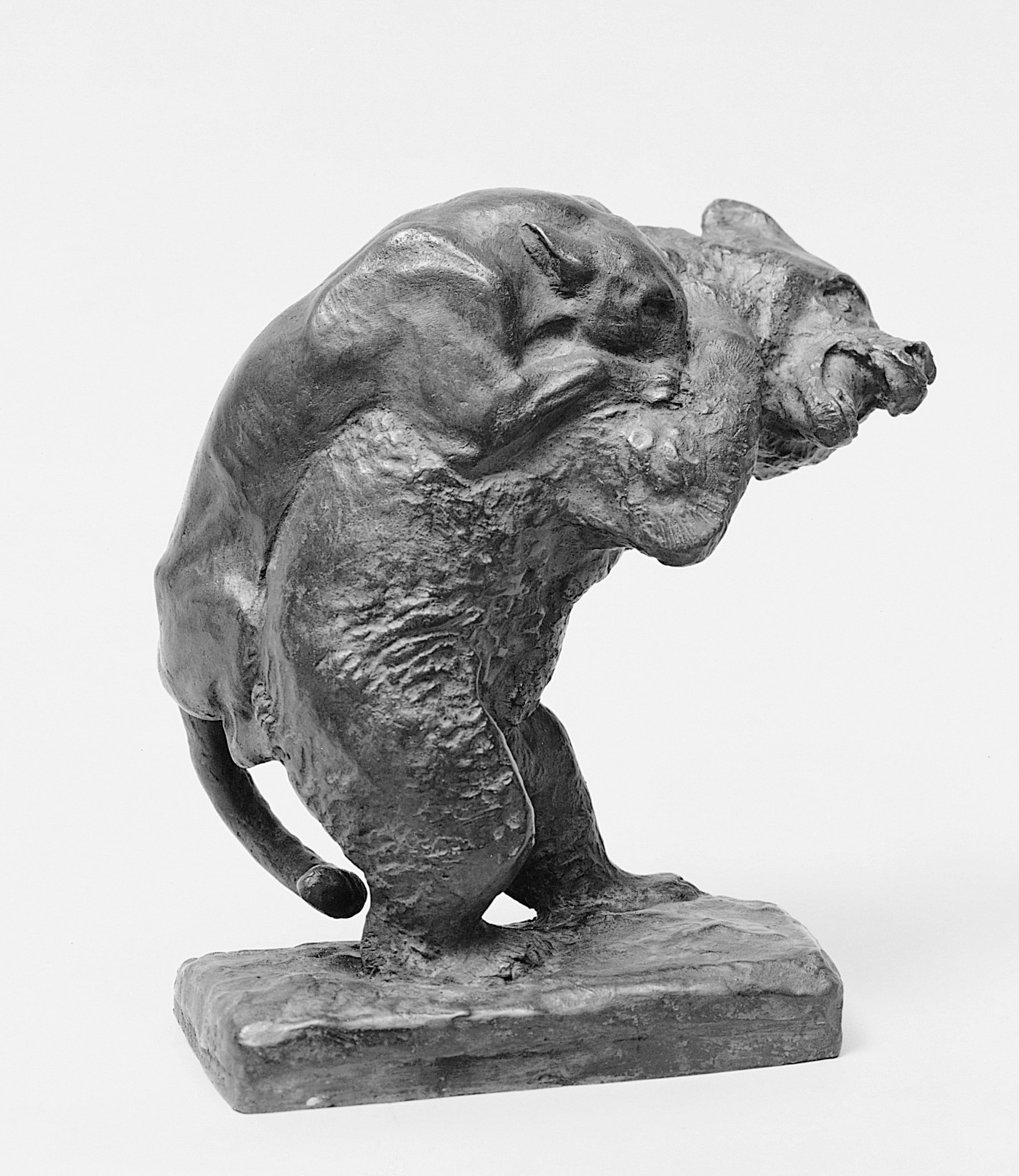
The Fight (c. 1906)

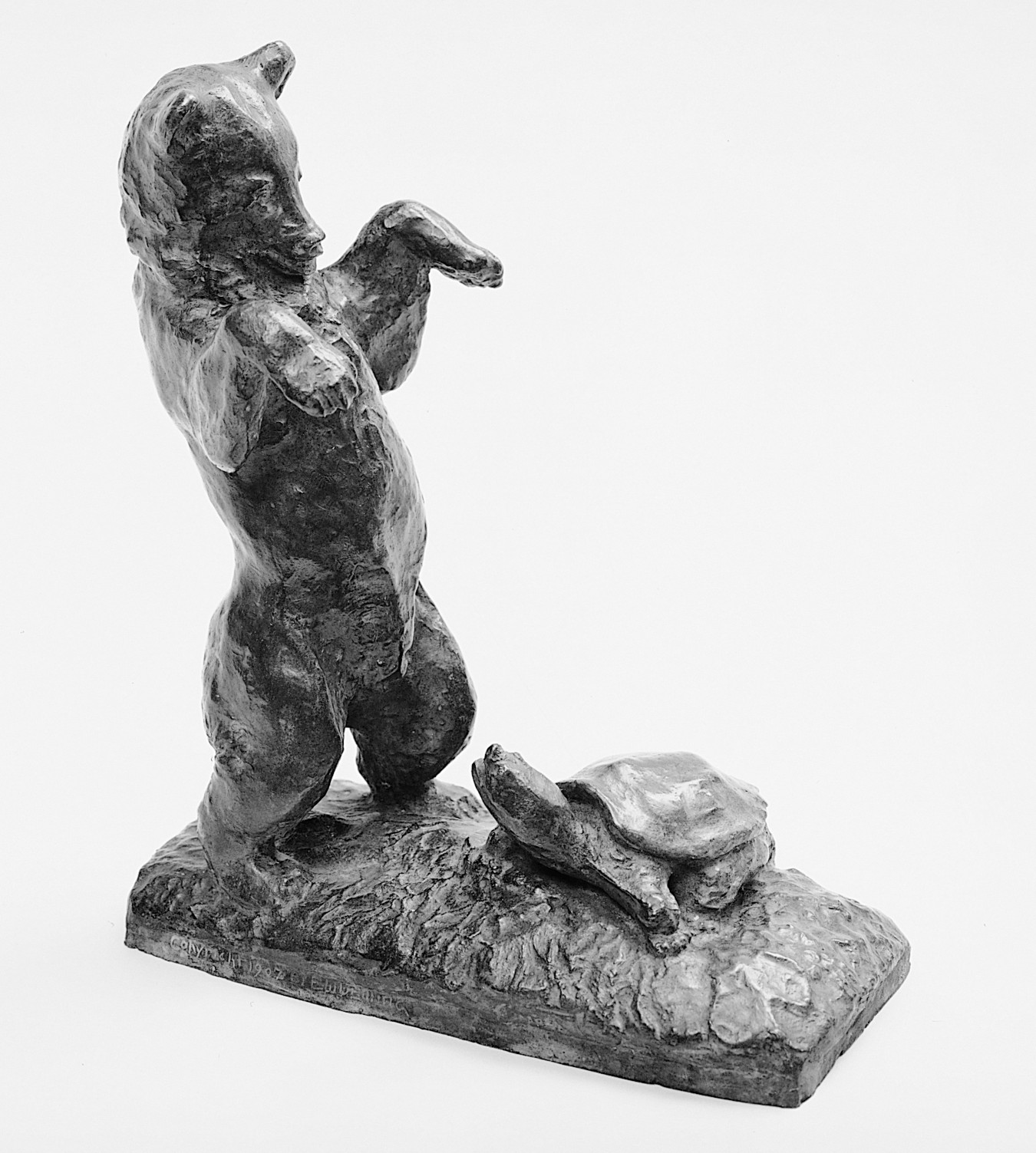
Mutual Surprise (1907)

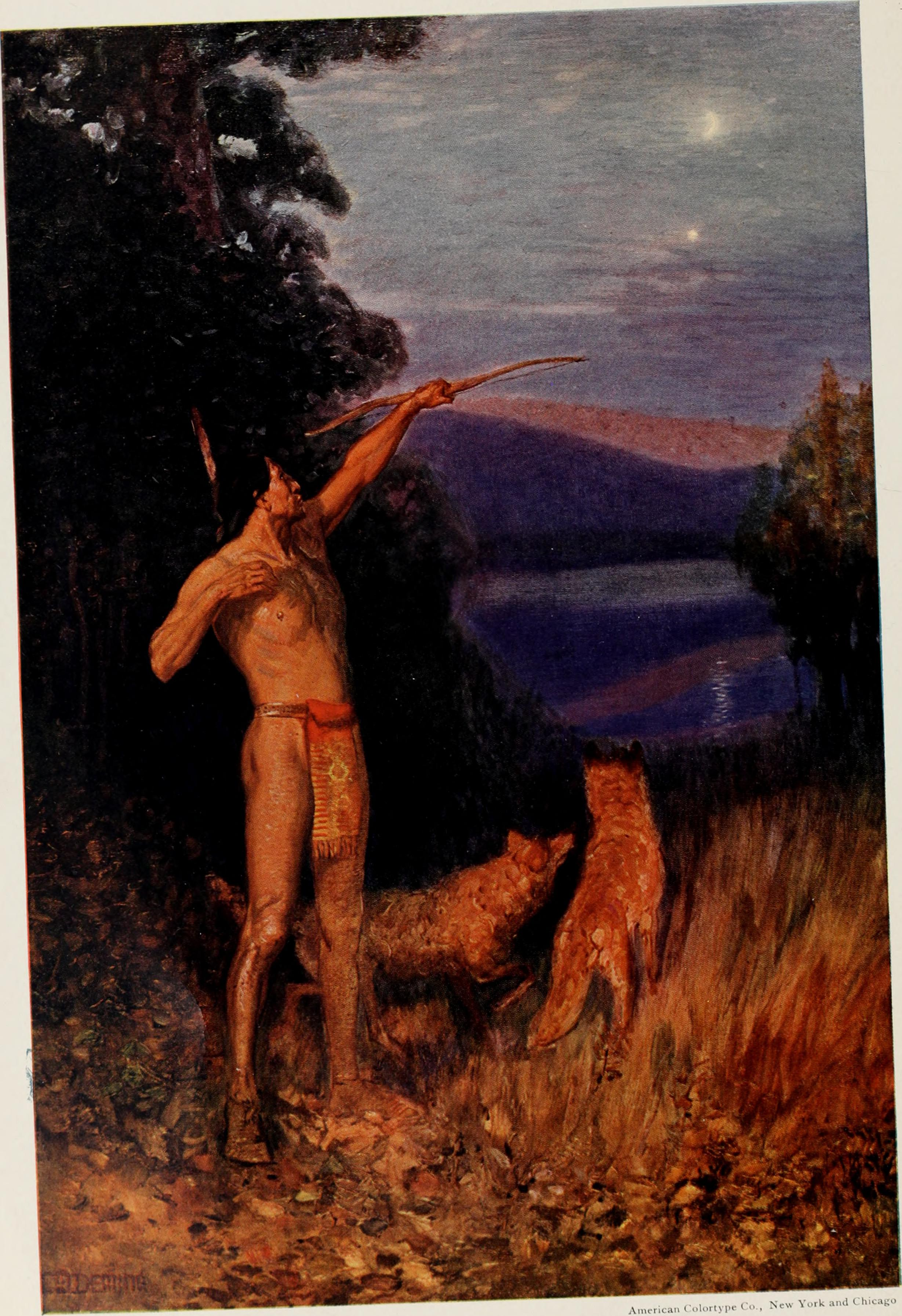
Good Luck Arrow (1908)
