= Jovan the Serb =

Jovan or John the Serb (Serbian: Јован Србин, Србин Јован/Jovan Srbin, Srbin Jovan, Greek: Ἱωάννης ό Σἐρβος) may refer to:

- Jovan the Serb of Kratovo (1526–1583), Serbian Orthodox priest and scribe
- Jovan II, Patriarch of the Serbs (1592–1613)
- Jovan Monasterlija (fl. 1683–1706), Austrian-Serbian commander of the Serbian Militia
