= Deming (given name) =

Deming is a Chinese given name, The same name is also spelled Takming in Cantonese pronunciation. Notable people with the name include:

== Real people ==
- Li Deming (981–1032), founder of the Tangut state
- Chen Deming (born 1949), Chinese/Taiwanese official
- Sun Deming, the birth name of Chinese statesman Sun Yat-sen (1866–1925)

== Fictional characters ==
- Ching Tak-ming (程德明), a character in Hong Kong film series Storm film series (反貪腐風暴系列電影)
- Koo Tak-Ming (古德明), a character in Hong Kong television series A Smiling Ghost Story (衝上人間)
- Song Tak-ming (宋德明), a character in Hong Kong television series Heartbreak Blues (與郎共舞)
