= Jovan Nikolić (priest) =

Jovan Nikolić (Serbian Cyrillic: Јован Николић, died 2000s) was a Serbian Orthodox priest in Zagreb, Croatia, and the only Serbian Orthodox priest to remain in Zagreb during the Croatian War.

He was a critic of the leadership of the Serbian Orthodox Church, and advocate of peaceful coexistence between Serbs and Croats, but was accused by conservative clerics of being a Marxist.

As Serbian Orthodox archpriest in Zagreb in 1995 Nikolić denied rumours of mass conversions to Roman Catholicism, however in 1996 he acknowledged the devastating results of ethnic conflict on the Serbian Orthodox Church in Croatia to Christianity Today.
