= Jovan Čokor =

Serbian epidemiologist, infectologist, and physician

Jovan Čokor (Serbian Cyrillic: Јован Чокор; 1849 – 1911) was a Serbian epidemiologist, infectologist, physician and university professor. He contributed to the works of Robert Koch. Koch wrote to Čokor, acknowledging his mistake and expressing his gratitude.

== Biography ==
His family settled in Vienna while preserving strong connections to their homeland. Čokor was educated by his uncle, archimandrite Julijan Čokor of Grabovac Monastery. He attended high school in Sremski Karlovci and later returned there as a professor during school breaks. After earning a medical degree in Vienna, he specialized in veterinary sciences, completing his studies in 1876.

From an early stage, he pursued microscopic-anatomical research and lectured on histology and parasitology as an assistant. He later became an adjunct in pathological anatomy and taught livestock and meat inspection, emphasizing the importance of histology and bacteriology. In 1881, he was appointed professor of general pathology and forensic veterinary medicine, and by 1889, he became a lecturer in infectious diseases at Vienna's medical faculty. In 1895, he was designated an unpaid associate professor of veterinary medicine at the University of Vienna.

His extensive research spanned histology, parasitology, pathology, infectious diseases, and forensic veterinary medicine, for which he authored a textbook.

His efforts led to the establishment of a dedicated parasitology department in Vienna.

Čokor maintained active collaboration with veterinary practitioners and medical institutions. He was an honorary member of the Serbian Medical Association in Belgrade and the Scientific Society in Kharkiv.
