= Jovan Karlo Villalba =

American painter

- Born: 1977 (age 48–49); Quito, Ecuador
- Education: New World School of the Arts; Cooper Union
- Known for: Painting, contemporary art
- Movement: Contemporary art

Jovan Karlo Villalba (born 1977 in Quito, Ecuador) is an American contemporary artist.

Jovan Karlo Villalba grew up in Miami, Florida. He graduated from New World School of the Arts in 1995 and from the Cooper Union School of Art in 1999. In 2000, he began his career in the Chelsea art district in New York City. Eight years later Villalba moved to Miami where he is now based.

Villalba's work has been included in dozens of exhibitions across the United States including solo exhibitions at Galleries in Los Angeles, Miami and New York City. His work has been featured in biennial exhibitions at the Art and Culture Center of Hollywood, Exit Art in New York City and the Queens Museum of Art.
