= Jeavons syndrome =

Type of epilepsy

Jeavons syndrome is a type of epilepsy. It is one of the most distinctive reflex syndromes of idiopathic generalized epilepsy characterized by the triad of eyelid myoclonia with and without absences, eye-closure-induced seizures, EEG paroxysms, or both, and photosensitivity. Eyelid myoclonia with or without absences is a form of epileptic seizure manifesting with myoclonic jerks of the eyelids with or without a brief absence. These are mainly precipitated by closing of the eyes and lights. Eyelid myoclonia is the defining seizure type of Jeavons syndrome.

== Signs and symptoms ==
Eyelid myoclonia, not the absences, is the hallmark of Jeavons syndrome. Eyelid myoclonia consists of marked jerking of the eyelids often associated with jerky upwards deviation of the eyeballs and retropulsion of the head (eyelid myoclonia without absences). This may be associated with or followed by mild impairment of consciousness (eyelid myoclonia with absences). The seizures are brief (3–6 s), and occur mainly and immediately after closing of the eyes (eye closure) and consistently many times a day. All patients are photosensitive. Generalised tonic-clonic seizures, either induced by lights or spontaneous, are probably inevitable in the long term and are provoked particularly by precipitating factors (sleep deprivation, alcohol) and inappropriate AED modifications. Myoclonic jerks of the limbs may occur, but are infrequent and random. Eyelid myoclonic status epilepticus, either spontaneous (mainly on awakening) or photically induced, occurs in a fifth of patients. It consists of repetitive and discontinuous episodes of eyelid myoclonia with mild absence, rather than continuous non- convulsive absence status epilepticus.

Onset is typically in childhood with a peak at age 6–8 years (range 2–14 years). There is a twofold preponderance of girls. Prevalence and incidence is probably low.

=== Precipitating factors ===
The most potent precipitating factor is eye closure, whether voluntary, involuntary or reflex. Most and, in some patients, all of the seizures are induced immediately after closure of the eyes in the presence of uninterrupted (non-flickering) light. Eye closure in total darkness is ineffective. Contrary to other forms of photosensitive epilepsies that are sensitive only to flickering lights, patients with Jeavons syndrome are also sensitive to bright, non-flickering lights. This is probably due to the enhancing effect of bright light on the sensitivity of eye closure.

== Cause ==
Jeavons syndrome is a genetically determined homogeneous syndrome, with a high prevalence of similar seizures in family members.

== Diagnosis ==
All tests apart from the EEG are normal. Video-EEG is the single most important procedure for the diagnosis of eyelid myoclonia with or without absences. It shows frequent high-amplitude 3–6 Hz generalized discharges of mainly polyspikes and waves. These are brief (1–6 s, commonly 2 or 3 s) and they are typically related to eye closure, i.e. they occur immediately (within 0.5–2 s) after closing the eyes in an illuminated recording room. Eyelid myoclonia of varying severity often occurs during these EEG discharges. Photoparoxysmal discharges induced by photic stimulation occur in all untreated young patients, but may be absent in older patients or those on medication. Sleep EEG patterns are normal and generalized discharges are more likely to increase during sleep, but may also decrease. The EEG and clinical manifestations deteriorate consistently after awakening. A normal EEG is rare, even in well-controlled patients.

=== Classification ===
The International League against Epilepsy has not yet recognized Jeavons syndrome despite overwhelming evidence of its existence. Instead, only ‘eyelid myoclonia’ has been accepted as an “absence seizure with special features”.

=== Differential diagnosis ===
The diagnosis of Jeavons syndrome is simple because the characteristic eyelid myoclonia, if seen once, will never be forgotten or confused with other conditions. Furthermore, the EEG with the characteristic eye-closure-related discharges and photosensitivity leaves no room for diagnostic error. Nevertheless, eyelid myoclonia is often misdiagnosed as facial tics, sometimes for many years. The symptom/seizure of eyelid myoclonia alone is not sufficient to characterise Jeavons syndrome, as it may also occur in symptomatic and cryptogenic epilepsies, which are betrayed by developmental delay, learning difficulties, neurological deficits, and abnormal MRI and background EEG.

== Management ==
Based on anecdotal evidence, the drugs of choice are those used for other idiopathic generalized epilepsies. Valproate alone, or most probably in combination with clonazepam, levetiracetam, lamotrigine or ethosuximide, appears to be the most effective regimen. The choice of the second drug depends on the main seizure type. Clonazepam is highly efficacious in eyelid myoclonia and myoclonic jerks. Of the newer antiepileptic drugs, levetiracetam may be the most effective, because of its anti myoclonic and anti photosensitive properties. Lamotrigine is very effective in absence seizures but may exaggerate myoclonic jerks. Contra-indicated drugs are: Carbamazepine, gabapentin, oxcarbazepine, phenytoin, pregabalin, tiagabine and vigabatrin. Lifestyle and avoidance of seizure precipitants are important. Non-pharmacological treatments used for photosensitive patients (such as wearing special glasses or the newly commercially available blue Z1 lenses) should be employed in Jeavons syndrome when photosensitivity persists.

== Prognosis ==
Jeavons syndrome is a lifelong disorder, even if seizures are well controlled with antiepileptic drugs. Men have a better prognosis than women. There is a tendency for photosensitivity to disappear in middle age, but eyelid myoclonia persists. It is highly resistant to treatment and occurs many times a day, often without apparent absences and even without demonstrable photosensitivity.
