= William Deming (politician) =

American politician (1833–1891)

Member of the Connecticut House of Representatives
- In office 1875–1876
- Constituency: Litchfield
- In office 1868–1868
- Constituency: Morris

Personal details
- Born: March 16, 1833 Litchfield, Connecticut, U.S.
- Died: September 20, 1891 (aged 58) Litchfield, Connecticut, U.S.
- Spouse: Mary Benton (m. 1858)
- Children: 3
- Education: Yale University
- Occupation: Politician; physician

William Deming (March 16, 1833 – September 20, 1891) was an American politician and physician.

== Early life ==
William Deming was born on March 16, 1833, in Litchfield, Connecticut, to Charlotte (née Tryon) and William Deming. He graduated from Yale Medical School in 1856.

== Career ==
Following graduation, Deming practiced medicine for nine years in Lenox, Massachusetts. He moved to Morris, Connecticut, but returned to Litchfield to continue practicing medicine until a few weeks before his death, except for one year he lived in Hartford. He was an early promoter and served as director and secretary of the Shepaug Railroad Company. From 1881 to 1882, he was president of the Connecticut Medical Society and he also served as president of the Litchfield County Medical Association.

Deming served in the Connecticut House of Representatives, representing Morris in 1868 and Litchfield from 1875 to 1876. He was the Democratic candidate for the Connecticut Senate in 1870.

== Personal life ==
Deming married Mary Benton, daughter of Horatio Benton, of Morris on December 18, 1858. They had one son and two daughters.

Deming died on September 20, 1891, at his home in Litchfield.
