= Demmin (surname) =

Demmin is a surname, which may be derived from Demmin, Germany.

Notable people with this surname include:

- Craig Demmin (born 1971), Trinidad and Tobago footballer
- Dwyane Demmin (born 1975), Trinidad and Tobago footballer
- Joyce Demmin, Trinidad and Tobago cricketer

== See also ==
- Demmin (disambiguation)
