= Jovan Paču =

Serbian composer and pianist

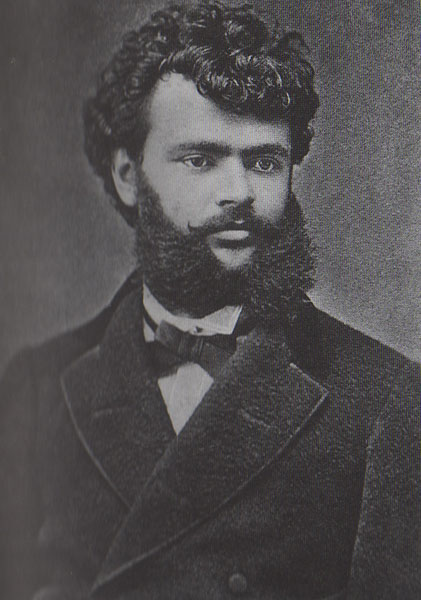
Jovan Paču

Jovan Paču (Aleksandrovo near Subotica, Austrian Empire, 17 March 1847 – Kikinda, Austria-Hungary, 30 October 1902) was a Serbian composer and pianist.

== Biography ==
During his education in Subotica, he distinguished himself as a gifted pianist, and as early as 1863 he played at a public concert. In parallel with his study of medicine in Prague (which he also studied in Pest) he studied privately with Bedřich Smetana.

He has played in Vienna, Budapest, Kiev (the first Serbian pianist in Imperial Russia), Belgrade, Osijek, Kikinda, Pančevo, Vršac and many places in Serbia and Vojvodina. With the inevitable salon virtuosity he stood out with his brilliant technique, and at concerts, he often performed works by Serbian composers, his contemporaries, as well as his own compositions and arrangements of folk tunes. Although using a very simple compositional technique, these works - on folk themes or in the folk spirit - were so popular that the people accepted them as their own (eg, "Branko's Wheel", created on the occasion of the transfer of Branko Radičević's bones from Vienna to Stražilovo in 1883). Paču's concerts had a great patriotic significance, especially in Hungary, where Serbs fought for their national rights. His compositions reflect, in addition to the romantic patriotic expression, the Biedermeier salon style of a brilliantly virtuoso character.

Paču was a member of the Serbian Learned Society. He worked as a physician in Kikinda, Sombor, Novi Sad, Zagreb, Sarajevo, Kiev. He died in Zagreb in 1902, and was buried in Kikinda according to his will.

== Works ==
- "Beseda za orkestar", 1875.
- "Bez tebe, draga" (for piano)
- "Brankovo kolo"
- "Chansonette serbe" (for piano)
- "Čuj, Dušane" (for piano)
- "Kolo" for 2 pianos 8-handed
- "Onamo, onamo" (for piano)
- "Prag je ovo milog Srpstva" (for piano)
- "Srpska molitva" for harmony and 2 pianos
- "Srpska rapsodija" for 2 pianos 6-handed, 1885.
- "Svetosavska pesma" (for piano)
- muzika na kazališnu igru "Naši seljani" (M. Popović)
