= Jovan Ninković =

Serbian footballer

Personal information
- Full name: Jovan Ninković
- Date of birth: 25 July 1987 (age 39)
- Place of birth: Novi Sad, SFR Yugoslavia
- Height: 1.82 m (5 ft 11 1/2 in)
- Position: Left-back

Senior career*
Years	Team	Apps	(Gls)
2006–2007	Novi Sad	28	(0)
2007–2011	Ruch Chorzów	4	(0)
2010	→ Polonia Słubice (loan)	15	(0)
2010	→ KSZO Ostrowiec (loan)	5	(0)
2011	→ Tur Turek (loan)	15	(0)
2011–2012	Górnik Łęczna	5	(0)
2012–2017	Zagłębie Sosnowiec	80	(2)
- * Club domestic league appearances and goals

Jovan Ninković (Serbian Cyrillic: Јован Нинковић; born 25 July 1987) is a Serbian former professional footballer who played as a left-back.

== Career ==
In August 2007, he moved to Ruch Chorzów on a four-year contract. In March 2010, he was loaned to Polonia Słubice on a half-year deal. In September 2010, he was loaned to KSZO Ostrowiec on a half-year deal. In January 2011, he was loaned to on a half-year deal.

In July 2011, he joined Górnik Łęczna.

== Personal life ==
He obtained Polish citizenship on 19 March 2016.
