= Joven Clarke =

Australian rugby league footballer

Personal information
- Born: 10 March 1983 (age 43) Sydney, New South Wales, Australia

Playing information
- Position: Wing
Club
Years	Team	Pld	T	G	FG	P
2002–06	South Sydney	8	4	0	0	16
- Source: As of 11 November 2019

Joven Clarke is an Australian former rugby league footballer. He previously played for the South Sydney Rabbitohs in the National Rugby League (NRL) competition, primarily playing on the wing. He was one of the fastest players in rugby league in 2002.

== Background ==
While attending Westfields Sports High School, Clarke played for the Australian Schoolboys team in 2000. Clarke is of Filipino descent.

== Playing career ==
Clarke played six games for South Sydney NRL team between 2002 and 2006 and scoring 4 tries. He was an ex 100m sprinter with a best time of 10.49s.

Clarke was eligible for and selected in the national rugby union team for The Philippines "The Volcanos" playing two tests in the 5 Nations Asian Cup played in Korea in 2011. He was also a member of the Australian Army team, they played a curtain raiser to the Australian/New Zealand test in 2011 at Skilled Stadium on the Gold Coast, scoring 5 tries. Australian Army V Australian Navy

He was eligible for the Tomahawks, the United States national rugby league team, but was never selected. As an Australian, Clarke was eligible to represent for Australia but was never selected to play.
