= Jovan Ajduković =

Serbian linguist

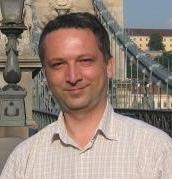
Jovan Ajdukovic is a Serbian linguist.

Jovan Ajduković (Serbian Cyrillic: Јован Ајдуковић; 10 January 1968, Novi Sad, Serbia) is a Serbian linguist.

Jovan Ajduković graduated from the University of Belgrade, Serbia in 1991. His main research interest is contact linguistics and Russian linguistics, in particular, study of Russianisms in Slavic languages, which was the topic of his Master and Ph.D. theses.

From 2003 to 2012 he was an editor of the international online journal Balkan Rusistics (University of Sofia). He was a member of the advisory board of The International Journal of Russian Studies (Ankara University, Turkey).

Jovan Ajduković is best known for his contribution to the so-called "Theory of Contacteme" (Ajduković 2004) and for his A Contactological Dictionary of Slavic Languages: The Contactological Dictionary of Adaptation of Bulgarian Contact-Lexemes under Russian Influence (Ajduković 2010, 2011), which formally describes the adaptation of Contact-Lexemes under Russian Influence on each level of language – orthographic, prosodic, phonetic-phonological, derivational, morphological, semantic, stylistic, syntactic and conceptual. According to Ajduković 2004 a contacteme, or the general unit of linguistic contactology "is a quantum of structured knowledge about the dominant language influence."

Since January 1992 Jovan Ajduković is the Director of The Scientific Laboratory of Slavistics and Linguistics (Belgrade, Serbia). He has published 12 books, and a lot of papers and articles.

Ajduković has been involved in the scientific project called Codes of Russian Cultures at the University of Belgrade, Faculty of Philology (Serbia). Special part of the project has been dedicated to Russian language in contact with other Slavonic and European languages.

== Bibliography ==
- Биобиблиографија са прилозима. Друго измењено и допуњено издање, Фото Футура, Београд, 2015, 158 стр. ISBN 978-86-83691-51-7 (Online Book) (Serbian)
- Руско-инословенска контактолошка истраживања. Фото Футура, Београд, 2014, 250 стр. ISBN 978-86-83691-50-0 (Online Book) (Serbian)
- Јован Ајдуковић, "Биобиблиографија са прилозима" (друго допуњено и измењено издање). Фото Футура, Београд, 2014, 153 стр. (Online Book) (Serbian)
- Јован Ајдуковић, "Радови из лингвистичке контактологије" // The Works on Linguistic Contactology. Фото Футура, Београд, 2012, 230 стр. ISBN 978-86-83691-47-0 (Online Book) (Serbian, Russian, English)
