= Jevon Demming =

British Virgin Islands footballer

Personal information
- Full name: Jevon Demming
- Date of birth: 11 February 1989 (age 37)
- Place of birth: British Virgin Islands
- Positions: Defender; midfielder

Senior career*
Years	Team	Apps	(Gls)
2011–2015	Virgin Gorda Ballstars		

International career^{‡}
- British Virgin Islands U20
2008–2014	British Virgin Islands	10	(0)
- * Club domestic league appearances and goals as of 3 January 2012 ‡ National team caps and goals as of 1 June 2018

Jevon Demming (born 11 February 1989) in the British Virgin Islands is a footballer who plays as a defender or midfielder and was capped at full international level by the British Virgin Islands national football team.

== Club career ==
In 2011, he signed with British Virgin Islands Championship club Virgin Gorda Ballstars.

== International career ==
He made his international debut for the British Virgin Islands national football team on 26 March 2008 in a World Cup qualifier against the Bahamas national football team.

Demming was named captain for the two World Cup qualifier games against the US Virgin Islands national football team in 2011.

== Personal life ==
In 2015, he was sentenced to seven years in prison for attempted murder while his cousin, Sherman Williams, received 15 years for an additional gun charge. In 2020 he lost an appeal against the conviction.
