= Jovan Zonjić =

Serbian modern painter

- Born: 1907
- Died: 1961 (aged 53–54)

Jovan Zonjić (1907–1961) was one of Montenegro's most important painters in the transition from academic to modern painting.

== Biography ==
Zonjić came from the village of Kralj near Andrijevica. From Andrijevica, his father Radisav Zonjić moved to Podgorica, then to Cetinje, where he ran cafés, and in Cetinje married a Herzegovinian from Berovo, Milica Popović.

Zonjić graduated from Royal Art School in Belgrade in 1931 and enrolled at the École des Beaux-Arts in Paris where he lived intermittently until 1939. With Zonjić's painting "Fethiye", which he exhibited in 1934 at the VII Autumn Exhibition in Belgrade, he received the "Belgraders to Belgrade Artists" Award. That award enabled him to return to Paris and resume his studies at the École des Beaux-Arts which he had previously interrupted due to financial difficulties. It was in Paris that he improved, in the midst of some fiercest competition at the time.

At the Exhibition of Yugoslav Artists in Paris in March 1939, the only painting purchased by the Musée National d'Art Moderne was Zonjić's "Black Woman" (nine of Zonjić's paintings were exhibited). Occupying Paris, the Nazis, as spoils of war, took from that museum what they considered significant. Among the looted paintings was his painting, "Black Woman". The original painting is now lost, but a reproduction of that painting was found by Branka Bogavac, former director of the Cultural Center of Yugoslavia in Paris. It was stored on one of the underground floors of the Musée National d'Art Moderne in Paris.

== Legacy ==
One critic wrote that Zonjić was not a favourite among Belgrade painters, because he endangered their position in the painting establishment since they could not challenge his painting abilities they resorted instead to spreading stories and rumours about him.

In 2007, an exhibition of Zonjić's paintings from the collection of the Cetinje Museums was organized in Berane and Andrijevica.
