= Jovanka =

Jovanka is the diminutive form of the Slavic female name Jovana.

It may refer to:

- Jovanka Broz, the former First Lady of Yugoslavia, wife of Josip Broz Tito
- Jovanka Houska, English chess player
- Tegan Jovanka, a fictional character in the television series Doctor Who
- Jovanka (Slavic folklore), a named vila (nymph) in Slavic mythology
