= Downing Street memo =

Record of secret meeting about Iraq War (2002)

The Downing Street memo (or the Downing Street Minutes), sometimes described by critics of the Iraq War as the smoking gun memo, is the note of a 23 July 2002 secret meeting of senior British government, defence and intelligence figures discussing the build-up to the war, which included direct reference to classified United States policy of the time. The name refers to 10 Downing Street, the residence of the British prime minister.

The memo, written by Downing Street foreign policy aide Matthew Rycroft, recorded the head of the Secret Intelligence Service (MI6) as expressing the view following his recent visit to Washington that "[George W.] Bush wanted to remove Saddam Hussein, through military action, justified by the conjunction of terrorism and WMD. But the intelligence and facts were being fixed around the policy." It quoted Foreign Secretary Jack Straw as saying it was clear that Bush had "made up his mind" to take military action but that "the case was thin." Straw also noted that Iraq retained "WMD capability" and that "Saddam would continue to play hard-ball with the UN." The military asked about the consequences "if Saddam used WMD on day one," posing Kuwait or Israel as potential targets. Attorney-General Lord Goldsmith warned that justifying the invasion on legal grounds would be difficult. However, the meeting took place several months before the adoption of United Nations Security Council Resolution 1441, the resolution eventually used as the legal basis for the invasion of Iraq. UNR687 also provided a pre-existing basis, as it required Iraq to divest itself of "100%" of all WMD capacity, which the Memo agreed it had not.

A copy of the memo was obtained by British journalist Michael Smith and published in The Sunday Times in May 2005, on the eve of British elections. Smith stated that the memo was equivalent to the Pentagon Papers which exposed American intentions in the Vietnam War and alleged the American media did not report more about it due to a perceived bias towards support for the war. Though its authenticity has never been seriously challenged, the British and American governments have stated that the contents do not accurately reflect their official policy positions at the time.

== Introduction ==
The memo was first published in The Sunday Times on 1 May 2005, during the last days of the UK general election campaign.

It went largely unremarked in the U.S. press at first, but was heavily covered in progressive blogs such as those on Daily Kos, because of a remark attributed to Richard Dearlove (then MI6 head) that "the intelligence and facts were being fixed [by the U.S.] around the policy" of removing Saddam Hussein from power, which was interpreted to show that US intelligence on Iraq prior to the war was deliberately falsified, rather than simply mistaken.

As this issue began to be covered by American media (Los Angeles Times on 12 May 2005, The Washington Post on 13 May 2005), two other main allegations stemming from the memo arose: that the UN weapons inspection process was manipulated to provide a legal pretext for the war, and that pre-war air strikes were deliberately ramped up in order to soften Iraqi infrastructure in preparation for war, prior to the October U.S. Senate vote permitting the invasion.

Some elements of the U.S. media have portrayed the document as faked or fraudulent, and Dana Perino referred in her daily White House press briefing on 4 December 2008 to the fact that the Bush administration has "debunked" the document previously. The British have tacitly validated its authenticity (as when Tony Blair replied to a press conference question by saying "that memorandum was written before we then went to the United Nations.")

A group of 131 members of Congress led by John Conyers, repeatedly requested that President George W. Bush respond to the contents of the document. A resolution of inquiry was filed by Representative Barbara Lee, which would request that the President and the State Department turn over all relevant information with regard to US policy towards Iraq. The resolution had 70 co-sponsors.

== Outline ==
The minutes were meant to be kept confidential and were headed "This record is extremely sensitive. No further copies should be made. It should be shown only to those with a genuine need to know its contents." It deals with the lead-up to the 2003 Iraq War, and comes at a point at which it becomes clear to those attending, that US President George W. Bush intended to remove Saddam Hussein from power by force.

The minutes run through the military options and then consider the political strategy in which an appeal for support from the international community and from domestic opinion would be most likely to be positively received. It suggests that an ultimatum for Saddam to allow back United Nations weapons inspectors be issued, and that this would help to make the use of force legal. Tony Blair is quoted as saying that the British public would support regime change in the right political context.

The most controversial paragraph is a report of a recent visit to Washington by head of the Secret Intelligence Service Sir Richard Dearlove (known in official terminology as 'C'):

C reported on his recent talks in Washington. There was a perceptible shift in attitude. Military action was now seen as inevitable. Bush wanted to remove Saddam, through military action, justified by the conjunction of terrorism and WMD. But the intelligence and facts were being fixed around the policy. The NSC had no patience with the UN route, and no enthusiasm for publishing material on the Iraqi regime's record. There was little discussion in Washington of the aftermath after military action.

The British analysis of US policy is also stated elsewhere in the minutes:

The Defence Secretary said that the US had already begun "spikes of activity" to put pressure on the regime. No decisions had been taken, but he thought the most likely timing in US minds for military action to begin was January, with the timeline beginning 30 days before the US Congressional elections.

The Foreign Secretary said he would discuss this with Colin Powell this week. It seemed clear that Bush had made up his mind to take military action, even if the timing was not yet decided. But the case was thin. Saddam was not threatening his neighbours, and his WMD capability was less than that of Libya, North Korea or Iran. We should work up a plan for an ultimatum to Saddam to allow back in the UN weapons inspectors. This would also help with the legal justification for the use of force.

The Attorney-General said that the desire for regime change was not a legal base for military action. There were three possible legal bases: self-defence, humanitarian intervention, or UNSC authorisation. The first and second could not be the base in this case. Relying on UNSCR 1205 of three years ago would be difficult. The situation might of course change.

The main sections covering the ultimatum are:

The Prime Minister said that it would make a big difference politically and legally if Saddam refused to allow in the UN inspectors. There were different strategies for dealing with Libya and Iran. Regime change and WMD were linked in the sense that it was the regime that was producing the WMD. If the political context were right, people would support regime change. The two key issues were whether the military plan worked and whether we had the political strategy to give the military plan the space to work.

...John Scarlett assessed that Saddam would allow the inspectors back in only when he thought the threat of military action was real.

The Defence Secretary said that if the Prime Minister wanted UK military involvement, he would need to decide this early. He cautioned that many in the US did not think it worth going down the ultimatum route. It would be important for the Prime Minister to set out the political context to Bush.

The minutes also outlines potential risks of an invasion of Iraq:

For instance, what were the consequences, if Saddam used WMD on day one, or if Baghdad did not collapse and urban warfighting began? You said that Saddam could also use his WMD on Kuwait. Or on Israel, added the Defence Secretary.

Copies of the minutes were sent to:

- Secretary of State for Defence Geoff Hoon,
- Secretary of State for Foreign and Commonwealth Affairs Jack Straw,
- Attorney General for England and Wales Lord Goldsmith,
- Cabinet Secretary Sir Richard Wilson,
- Chairman of the Joint Intelligence Committee John Scarlett,
- Director of the Government Communications Headquarters Francis Richards,
- Chief of the Defence Staff Sir Michael Boyce,
- Head of the Secret Intelligence Service Richard Dearlove,
- Prime Minister's Chief of Staff Jonathan Powell,
- Downing Street Director of Government Relations Sally Morgan, and
- Downing Street Director of Communications and Strategy Alastair Campbell.

== Reaction ==
=== Proponents of an inquiry ===
In the United States, proponents of a formal congressional inquiry say that the minutes, along with testimonies from credible witnesses, shed sufficient doubt on the actions of the Bush administration to warrant a formal inquiry. In particular, they say that the minutes indicate that the administration was determined to go to war with Iraq prior to considerations of legality, and with full knowledge that, at best, "the case was thin." And furthermore that they selected and exaggerated intelligence so as to confirm their policy and developed a plan to manipulate public opinion. Also, proponents say that the contents (such as "Military action was now seen as inevitable.") and the date of the memo, 23 July 2002, contradicts the official White House position that President Bush did not finally decide to carry out the invasion of March 2003 until after Secretary of State Colin L. Powell presented the administration's case to the United Nations Security Council, in a speech on 5 February 2003. They also say that the minutes are dated at a time when Bush stated that "we haven't made any decisions on Iraq, but all options are on the table."

Another paragraph has been taken to show that Geoff Hoon believed the timing of the war was intended to influence American elections:

The Defence Secretary said that the US had already begun "spikes of activity" to put pressure on the regime. No decisions had been taken, but he thought the most likely timing in US minds for military action to begin was January, with the timeline beginning 30 days before the US Congressional elections.

It has been said that some of those present at the meeting believed that Iraq might possess weapons of mass destruction (WMD) "capacity". However, the minutes explicitly state that the capability was less than that of Libya, Iran, and North Korea, and that Saddam was not threatening his neighbours.

=== U.S. Congress ===
On 5 May 2005, Democratic Congressman John Conyers sent a letter to President Bush signed by 89 of his colleagues demanding an explanation of the "troubling revelations" in the memo. No specific White House response to the letter was ever made publicly. In response to the Bush administration's refusal to answer the congressional delegation's questions, Conyers et al. considered sending a fact-finding mission to the UK.

Conyers initially requested 100,000 signatures from citizens (a petition) to request that President Bush answer the questions in his letter. The letter began accumulating between 20,000 and 25,000 signatures a day, boosted by progressive political action group MoveOn.org, which joined the campaign on 9 June. By 13 June 2005, the letter had received over 540,000 signatures from citizens, and more congressmen had signed on, bringing the total to 94 – three days later, over 100 congressmen had signed the letter, including then-Minority Leader Nancy Pelosi.

On 16 June 2005, Conyers presided over an unofficial hearing or forum on the Downing Street memo in a basement room in the Capitol where notable opponents of the Iraq War Joseph C. Wilson, Ray McGovern and Cindy Sheehan, among others, testified.

=== Internet ===
Smintheus at Daily Kos and MYDD first addressed the memo on the night of 30 April 2005. By the next morning the document was elevated to a major story on the Daily Kos, where Democratic Congressman John Conyers learned of its existence.

A website, www.downingstreetmemo.com, was created on 13 May, "to fill a void left by the American mainstream media," and continues with its primary aim "to provide a resource for anyone who wants to understand the meaning and context of these documents as they relate to the Bush administration's case for war."

On 30 May 2005, in a "blogswarm" fueled by the memo, hundreds of blogs joined together to form the Big Brass Alliance in support of After Downing Street.

On 1 June 2005 a targeted media campaign called 'Awaken the Mainstream Media' began jointly at Daily Kos and downingstreetmemo.com. Every day it listed new contact information for three news outlets, so that readers could contact them to urge them to provide better coverage of the issues around the Downing Street memo and other released documents.

=== Pundits ===
On 18 May, conservative pundit and former Reagan administration advisor Paul Craig Roberts wrote an article calling for Bush's impeachment for lying to Congress about the case for war.

On 31 May, liberal consumer advocate and former presidential hopeful Ralph Nader wrote an article on ZNet calling for Bush and Cheney's impeachment under Article II, Section 4 of the United States Constitution. Also on that day, he and Kevin Zeese authored an op-ed for The Boston Globe to support the call for impeachment against Bush, citing the memo as part of the evidence that the possibility of deliberate deception by the administration should be investigated.

On 30 January 2006, an article entitled The Impeachment of George W. Bush, written by Elizabeth Holtzman (Rep. NY-D 1973–1981, member of the House Judiciary Committee that held impeachment hearings of President Richard Nixon) was published by the left-wing periodical The Nation. The article makes specific references to the Downing Street memo.

=== Political groups ===
A coalition of American groups known as After Downing Street, co-founded by a group of longtime progressive and/or Democratic Party activists, called on Congress to file a Resolution of Inquiry, the first necessary legal step to determine whether President Bush had committed impeachable offences. The formal Resolution of Inquiry request was written by Boston constitutional attorney John C. Bonifaz. The request states the constitutional grounds for impeachment:

[The US President] has not given [the Senate] full information, but has concealed important intelligence which he ought to have communicated, and by that means induced them to enter into measures injurious to their country, and which they would not have consented to had the true state of things been disclosed to them.

Democrats.com raised one thousand dollars, offered as a reward to anyone who could get George Bush to answer the following question "Yes" or "No:

In July 2002, did you and your administration "fix" the intelligence and facts about non-existent Iraqi WMD's and ties to terrorism – which were disputed by US intelligence officials – to sell your decision to invade Iraq to Congress, the American People, and the world – as quoted in the Downing Street Minutes?

In addition a number of lesser prizes were offered for lesser responses, down to a $100 for posing the question clearly to Bush.

== News coverage ==
The Downing Street Minutes was a major story in the British press during the last few days of the 2005 general election campaign and was also covered in other countries. The story initially had limited coverage in the US but later recently received greater attention in the American press. The organisation Fairness and Accuracy in Reporting has been among those that have criticised the US print media, saying they "continue to downplay [the] story." According to Media Matters for America, there were some early mentions in The New York Times, the San Francisco Chronicle, the New York Sun, and The Washington Post, though coverage was slight (the Post's first article appeared in the "Style" section) and primarily aimed at the impact it would have on the British elections, rather than how it affected the Bush administration. The Knight-Ridder news service produced some reportage at the time, but independent articles were limited. The Los Angeles Times and Star Tribune put local reporters on the story, and produced early articles on 12 May and 13 May, respectively.

At the Star Tribune, initial interest had been piqued after a reader e-mailed information he had seen on the Internet to the paper's ombudsman, who forwarded it to others in the news department. Being quite a distance from London, editors first waited for articles to come across on wire services. Undoubtedly, many other newspapers across the country reacted similarly. After a few days of no news, however, a local reporter was assigned. The article was initially scheduled to run on 11 May, but was pushed back so that it could have greater prominence on a slower news day later in the week.

Since that time, much of the coverage about the memo has discussed the lack of coverage. One of the first reports include that topic was a 17 May article in The Christian Science Monitor. The report was one of the most extensive for a nationwide publication up until that time.

On 20 May 2005, Daniel Okrent, the Public Editor at the time for The New York Times, publicly assessed the coverage of the minutes in the paper in a forum on the NYT's website. He also stated that, due to continuing reader interest, the paper intends to give fuller coverage to the memo. Although Okrent stepped down at the end of May (the routine end of his term), on NewsHour on 8 June he suggested some possible reasons that the US media had been so slow to cover what he considered a very important story. He said it may have been assigned to 'foreign news' correspondents and wasn't seen as a Bush story, or it may be the US media was still working on researching it (although he then admitted he had no reason to believe that).

Also on 8 June, USA Today printed an article by their senior assignment editor for foreign news, Jim Cox, saying with respect to the memo, "We could not obtain the memo or a copy of it from a reliable source. ... There was no explicit confirmation of its authenticity from (Blair's office). And it was disclosed four days before the British elections, raising concerns about the timing."

The Star Tribune revisited the Downing Street Minutes as part of the evidence in a Memorial Day editorial. It stated explicitly,

President Bush and those around him lied, and the rest of us let them. Harsh? Yes. True? Also yes. Perhaps it happened because Americans, understandably, don't expect untruths from those in power. But that works better as an explanation than as an excuse.... It turns out that former counterterrorism chief Richard Clarke and former Treasury Secretary Paul O'Neill were right. Both have been pilloried for writing that by summer 2002 Bush had already decided to invade.

The New York Times reported on the memos on 27 March 2006.

MSNBC reported on the memos on 28 March 2006. MSNBC has an article and a video clip from NBC Nightly News with Brian Williams.

The Colombian newspaper El Tiempo implicated the Prime Minister's role in the Iraq War on 9 May 2007 – and the Downing Street memo specifically – as "the principal reason for the UK's disillusionment with Tony Blair."

The Chilean newspaper La Segunda on 11 May 2007 called the Downing Street memo "one of the best-kept secrets in Tony Blair's ten years as prime minister."

One of the first articles on the memo to appear in the US media quoted "a former senior US official", who, speaking on condition of anonymity, called the memo's account "an absolutely accurate description of what transpired" during the senior British intelligence officer's visit to Washington. UK Prime Minister Tony Blair denied that anything in the memo demonstrated misconduct and said that it added little to what was already known about how British policy on Iraq developed, also commenting that "that memorandum was written before we went to the United Nations".

- White House spokesman Scott McClellan, US Secretary of State Condoleezza Rice and UK Foreign Secretary Jack Straw did not confirm or deny the accuracy of the memo when questioned about it.
- George W. Bush has not responded to questions from Congress regarding the memo's accuracy.
- When asked about the contents of the memo by Plaid Cymru MP Adam Price in the House of Commons on 29 June 2005, Blair again refrained from disputing the document's authenticity, saying only "[...]that memo and other documents of the time were covered by the Butler review. In addition, that was before we went to the United Nations and secured the second resolution, 1441, which had unanimous support."
- According to CNN, currently classified documents which were dated at the same month as the Downing Street memo, March 2002, were uncovered in Iraq, and contained evidence that Russian intelligence notified Iraq about the "determination of the United States and Britain to launch military action."

=== US President George W. Bush ===
On 7 June 2005, at a joint George W. Bush-Tony Blair press briefing in the White House, Reuters correspondent Steve Holland asked, "On Iraq, the so-called Downing Street memo from July 2002 says intelligence and facts were being fixed around the policy of removing Saddam through military action. Is this an accurate reflection of what happened? Could both of you respond?" President Bush did not address the issue of the intelligence and facts being "fixed" around a decision to go to war, but he did deny that he had, at the time of the memo, already decided to use military force against Saddam Hussein, saying "There's nothing farther from the truth." Bush also questioned the motives of whoever leaked the memo during the British election, saying "Well, I—you know, I read kind of the characterisations of the memo, particularly when they dropped it out in the middle of his race. ... I'm not sure who 'they dropped it out' is, but—I'm not suggesting that you all dropped it out there."

=== UK Prime Minister Tony Blair ===
When the document was published, UK Prime Minister Tony Blair denied that anything in the memo demonstrated misconduct and said that it added little to what was already known about how British policy on Iraq developed.

Blair's response to Steve Holland at the joint news conference with Bush was "No, the facts were not being fixed in any shape or form at all". He also reiterated that he and Bush had continued to try to find a way to avert war, "As it happened, we weren't able to do that because – as I think was very clear – there was no way that Saddam Hussein was ever going to change the way that he worked, or the way that he acted,". He said the same thing in a 7 June 2005 interview with Gwen Ifill on The NewsHour with Jim Lehrer.

=== White House spokesman Scott McClellan ===
On 16 May, presidential spokesman Scott McClellan said that the memo's statement that intelligence was "being fixed" to support a decision to invade Iraq was "flat out wrong". However, McClellan admitted that he has not read the memo, but has only received reports of what it contains.

On 17 May, McClellan told reporters that the White House saw "no need" to respond to the letter from Congress.

On 23 May, when BTC News reporter Eric Brewer asked him about his 16 May statement, McClellan said:

Let me correct you... let me correct you on the characterisation of the quote you attributed to me. I'm referring to some of the allegations that were made referring to a report. In terms of the intelligence, the – if anyone wants to know how the intelligence was used by the administration, all they have to do is go back and look at all the public comments over the course of the lead-up to the war in Iraq, and that's all very public information. Everybody who was there could see how we used that intelligence.

The following day, a popular political blog, ThinkProgress, posted a response titled "Take the McClellan Challenge", comparing what the intelligence was with how it was used by the administration.

=== US Secretary of State Rice and UK Foreign Secretary Straw ===
On 1 May 2005, US Secretary of State Condoleezza Rice and UK Foreign Secretary Jack Straw were questioned on the memo, although neither was able to give a detailed answer. Straw stated that he had not expected the question to come up.

== Veracity of the memo ==
Following the advice of company lawyers, Michael Smith, the journalist who first reported on the Downing Street Memo, has said that he protected the identity of his source by reproducing all documents and returning the 'originals' back to the source. In some cases, a document was retyped from a photocopy, and the photocopy destroyed. This has led some to question the document's authenticity, but no official source has questioned it, and it has been unofficially confirmed to various news organisations, including The Washington Post, NBC, The Sunday Times, and the Los Angeles Times. Several other documents obtained by Smith, and treated similarly (see below), were confirmed as genuine by the UK Foreign Office.

== Additional documents ==
Previous to the appearance of the Downing Street Memo, six other British (Blair) Cabinet papers originating around March 2002 were obtained by Michael Smith and used in two Daily Telegraph stories published on 18 September 2004. The documents describe issues relating to the meetings held between Bush and Blair at Bush's Crawford, Texas, ranch in April 2002. They are:

1. Iraq: Options Paper, prepared by the Overseas & Defence Secretariat in the Cabinet Office, dated 8 March 2002, describing options available for pursuing regime change in Iraq
2. Iraq: Legal Background, prepared by the Foreign & Commonwealth Office Legal Department, dated 8 March 2002
3. a report from David Manning to Tony Blair on his meeting with Condoleezza Rice, dated 14 March 2002
4. a report from Christopher Meyer to David Manning on his meeting with Paul Wolfowitz, dated 18 March 2002
5. a memo from Peter Ricketts, Political Director, Foreign & Commonwealth Office, to the Foreign Secretary, Jack Straw, dated 22 March 2002, with background and opinion for Straw's advice to Tony Blair ahead of his meeting with George Bush in April
6. a memo from Jack Straw to Tony Blair, 25 March 2002 containing advice ahead of Blair's meeting with George Bush in April.

On receipt of the documents, in September 2004, acting on the advice of lawyers, Smith says he photocopied them and returned the originals to his source, then, after the Telegraph's legal desk secretary typed transcripts on an "old fashioned typewriter", the Telegraph destroyed their copies of the originals, in order to frustrate any future police investigation of the leaks.

The documents were widely quoted in the British press immediately following the Telegraph's story, for example in The Guardian and The Sunday Herald.

On 5 October 2004, facsimiles of these documents appeared online, provided by Professor Michael Lewis of Cambridge University, who had also housed the file at Iraq expert Glen Rangwala's Middle East Reference website. The file derives ultimately from the typed transcript of the documents made by Smith and the Telegraph.

Interest in these documents was revived around 8 June 2005, following their appearance in a discussion thread at Democratic Underground and subsequently they began to be quoted in US media, after Rawstory and NBC verified their authenticity with Smith and British government sources.

The Los Angeles Times published an article on 15 June 2005, describing several of the "new" documents; the article says that "Michael Smith, the defense writer for The Sunday Times who revealed the Downing Street minutes in a story 1 May, provided a full text of the six new documents to the Los Angeles Times."

The six documents are available in PDF form from the Think Progress web site.

A further document, a 21 July 2002, cabinet office paper titled "Conditions for Military Action", which is a briefing paper for the meeting of which the Downing Street Memo is the minutes, was published (with the last page missing) by The Sunday Times on 12 June 2005.

Another document was the Rycroft email, showing the author of the Downing Street Memo actually believed that Saddam should be removed because of a threat by Iraq getting WMDs into the hands of terrorists.

The 18 September 2004 article in The Daily Telegraph contains the only known reproductions of the original memos (scanned from a photocopy). That article is called "Failure is not an option, but it doesn't mean they will avoid it".

On Thursday, 16 June 2005 Reuters mislabelled a photograph of what it claimed was "a copy of the Downing Street Memo".

It turned out to actually be a picture of a document found in a 28 April 2005 Guardian Unlimited story. (At this link, view this PDF: 07.03.03: Attorney general's full advice on Iraq war (pdf)) This PDF detailed Lord Goldsmith's confidential advice on the legality of the Iraq war and does not match the text of any of the alleged Downing Street Memos. It's an entirely different document that describes legal authorisation for the invasion of Iraq under standing UN resolutions.

== Criticism of the memo ==
Journalists such as Fred Kaplan point out that the later section of the memo that discusses potential consequences of an invasion, including Saddam's use of WMD against Kuwait or Israel, directly contradicts interpretations of the memo as a "smoking gun" about WMD fabrication.

For instance, what were the consequences, if Saddam used WMD on day one, or if Baghdad did not collapse and urban warfighting began? You said that Saddam could also use his WMD on Kuwait. Or on Israel, added the Defence Secretary.

As mentioned above, shortly after the appearance of the memo, Tony Blair was asked:

The so-called Downing Street memo from July 2002 says intelligence and facts were being fixed around the policy of removing Saddam through military action. Is this an accurate reflection of what happened?

Blair responded:

No, the facts were not being fixed in any shape or form at all.

It is not clear whether this is a criticism of the assessment of his own head of foreign intelligence (Dearlove) or a criticism of a particular interpretation of Dearlove's phrase "fixed around".

=== "Fixed" ===
The interpretation of the sentence: "But the intelligence and facts were being fixed around the policy." has caused debate.

Robin Niblett, a member of the Center for Strategic and International Studies, a Washington think tank, has said it would be easy for Americans to misunderstand the reference to intelligence being "fixed around" Iraq policy. " 'Fixed around' in British English means 'bolted on' rather than altered to fit the policy," he says. This view was seconded by Christopher Hitchens and Fred Kaplan.

Others have suggested various British English usages of the phrase "were being fixed" (for example as a colloquialism meaning "to agree upon,") which are distinct from the usage (both American and British) derived from criminal argot, meaning "fraudulently altered or changed." The author of the memo, Matthew Rycroft, employed the former usage in an e-mail when talking about an appointment, This is now fixed for 0800. Some detractors from the memo have appeared to make the argument or give the impression that the "fraudulently altered" sense of "fix" is uniquely American and does not exist in British English, but this is false.

Other commentators have dismissed this, saying that context makes it clear that "being fixed around" used "fix" in the sense of "fraudulently arrange the result", a common British usage (sense 12(b) of "fix" in the printed Concise Oxford English Dictionary, given as sense 7, "deviously influence the outcome of" in the Compact OED online version.) The argument has also been made that this view is supported by negative qualification implied by the presence of the word "But" at the start of the relevant sentence: "But the intelligence and facts were being (innocently) agreed upon around the policy" is, it is said, an implausible reading because there is nothing negative, per se, about agreement, whereas "But the intelligence and facts were being fraudulently arranged ...", it is argued, appears to make perfect sense, because it fulfills the negative expectation set up by the word "but".

Fred Kaplan noted that "Either way—'fixed' or 'fixed around'—Bush and his aides had decided to let policy shape intelligence, not the other way around; they were explicitly politicising intelligence."

When asked about the memo's implication that Iraq intelligence was being "fixed", White House spokesman Scott McClellan said, "The suggestion is just flat-out wrong." But McClellan would later admit that intelligence was suited to fit the policy in a tell-all book.

An Iraq "options paper", dated 8 March 2002, stated: "Despite sanctions, Iraq continues to develop WMD" (though it adds that intelligence on the matter is "poor").

== See also ==
- Bush–Aznar memo
- Bush–Blair 2003 Iraq memo
- Iraq Dossier – follow-up to the September Dossier
- Iraq Inquiry
- Niger uranium forgeries
- Office of Special Plans
- Operation Rockingham
- Plame affair
- September Dossier – UK government report on Iraq threat pre-war
- United Nations Security Council and the Iraq War
