= Efforts to impeach George W. Bush =

Talks and activities of a possible impeachment of George W. Bush

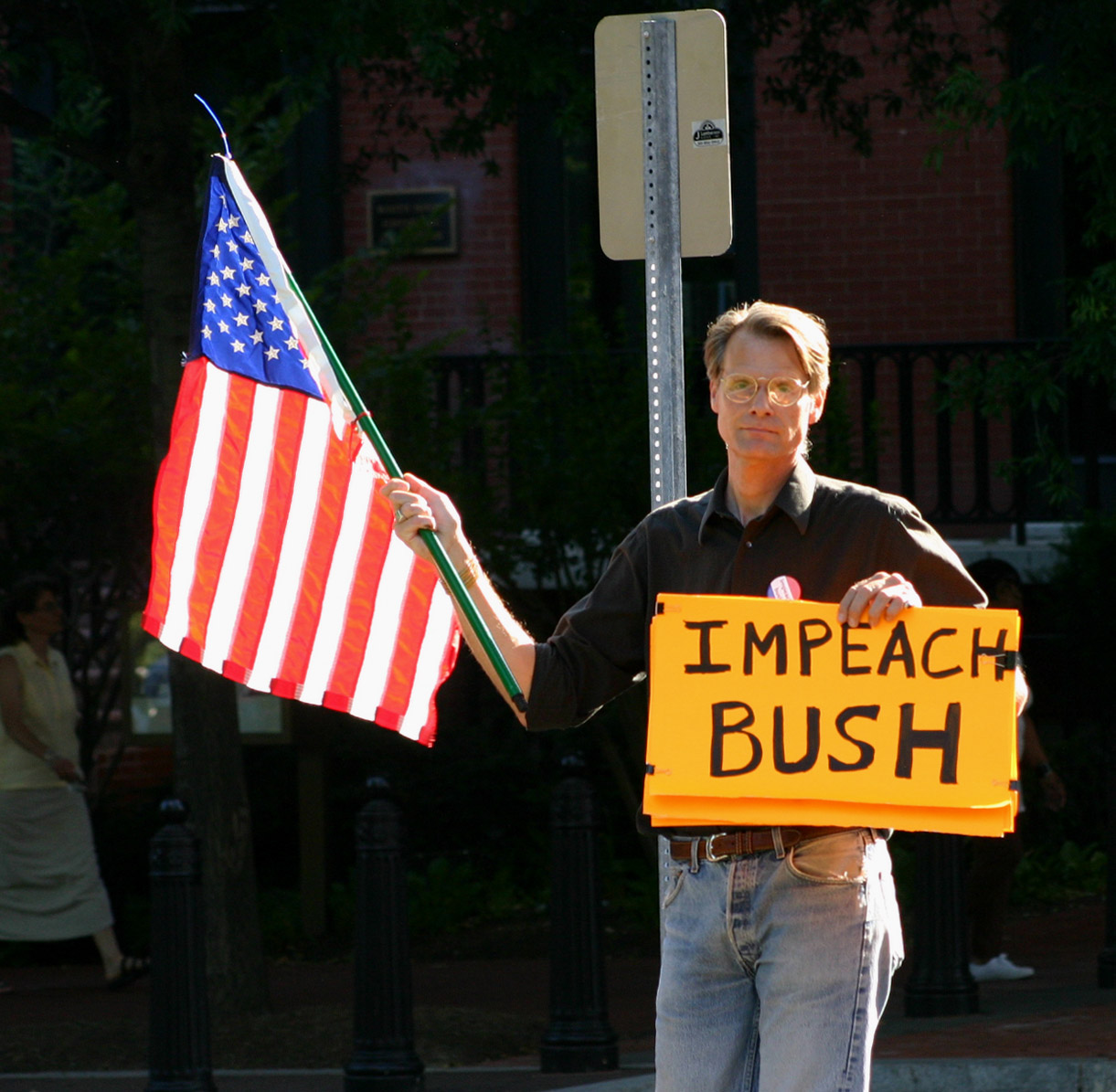
A protester calling for the impeachment of Bush on June 16, 2005

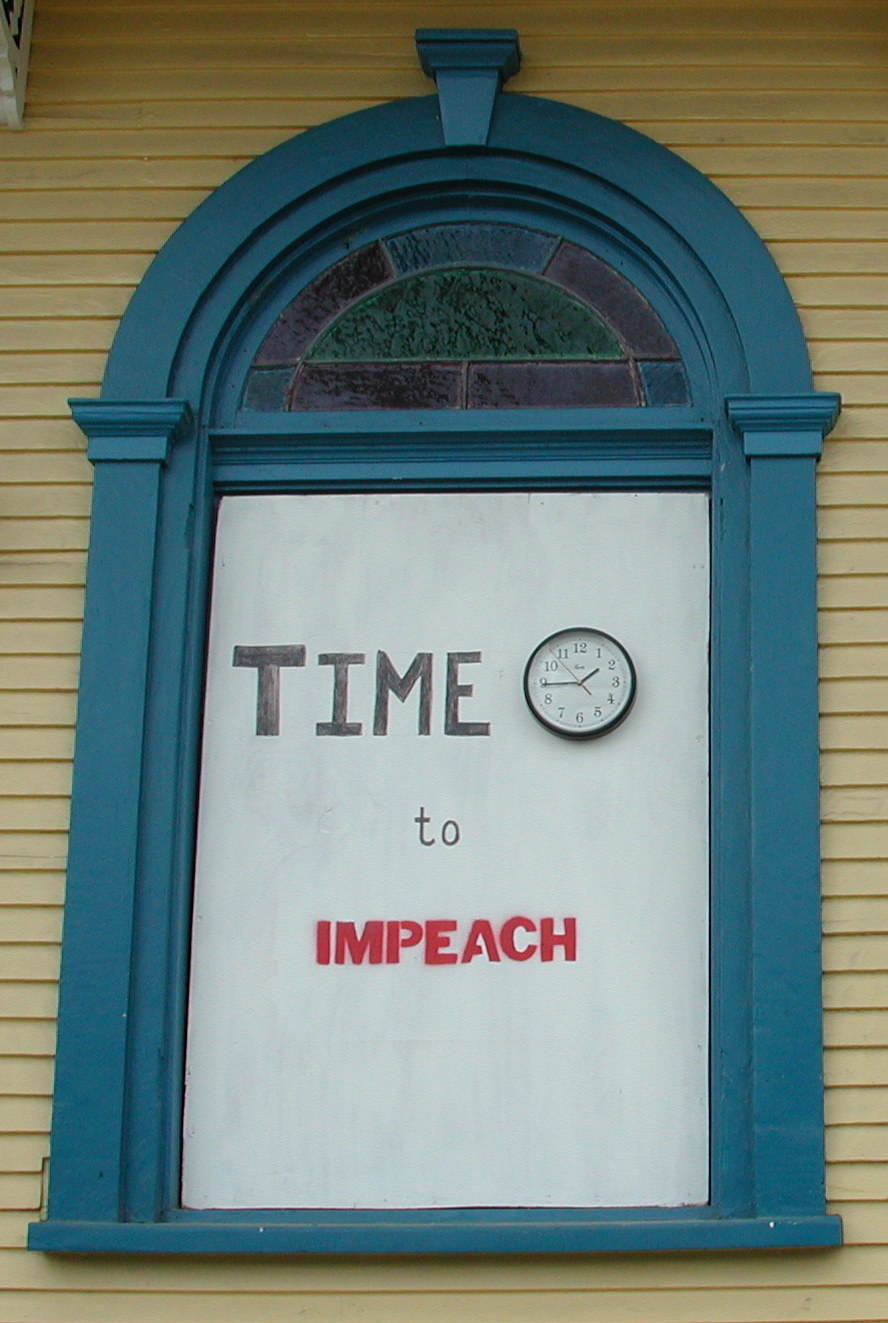
Window display in New Orleans calling for impeachment in March 2006

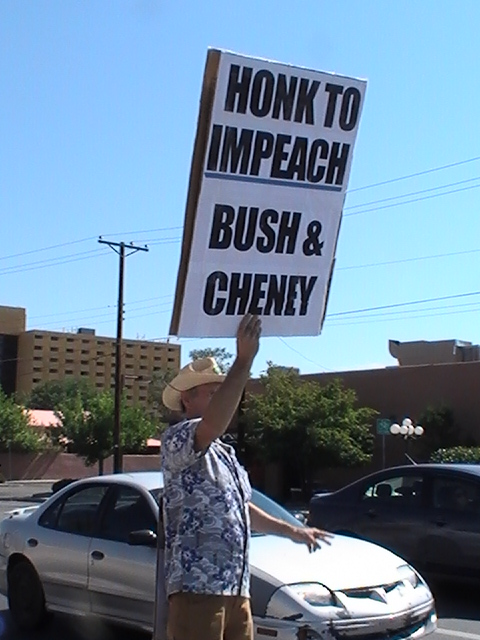
Man protesting in Albuquerque, New Mexico in support of impeaching both Bush and Vice President Dick Cheney in July 2008

During the presidency of George W. Bush, several American politicians sought to either investigate Bush for possible impeachable offenses related to the Iraq War, or to bring actual impeachment charges on the floor of the United States House of Representatives Judiciary Committee.

The most significant of these efforts occurred on June 10, 2008, when Congressman Dennis Kucinich, along with co-sponsor Robert Wexler, introduced 35 articles of impeachment against Bush to the U.S. House of Representatives.

The House voted 251 to 166 to refer the impeachment resolution to the Judiciary Committee on June 11, where no further action was taken on it. Bush's presidency ended on January 20, 2009, with the completion of his second term in office, rendering impeachment efforts moot.

== Kucinich–Wexler impeachment articles ==
The Kucinich–Wexler impeachment resolution contained 35 articles of impeachment covering the Iraq War, the Valerie Plame affair, creating a case for war with Iran, capture and treatment of prisoners of war, spying and or wiretapping inside the United States, use of signing statements, failing to comply with Congressional subpoenas, the 2004 elections, Medicare, Hurricane Katrina, global warming, and 9/11.

The 2003 invasion of Iraq was the most substantial portion of the articles of impeachment introduced by Kucinich and Wexler. Fifteen of the 35 articles directly relate to alleged misconduct by Bush in seeking authority for the war, and in the conduct of military action itself. Five other articles address allegations partially or tertiarily relating to the war, including the "outing" of Valerie Plame, treatment of prisoners (both in Iraq and from operations in Afghanistan and other countries), and building a case for Iran being a threat based in part on alleging Iranian actions in Iraq.

=== Justification for invasion ===
The first four impeachment articles charge the president with illegally creating a case for war with Iraq, including charges of a propaganda campaign, falsely representing Iraq as responsible for 9/11, and falsely representing Iraq as an imminent danger to the United States.

=== Legitimacy of invasion ===
Articles 5–8 and 12 deal with the invasion of Iraq and include charges that funds were misspent before the war, that the war was in violation of HJRes114, that Iraq was invaded without a war declaration, that the war is a violation of the UN Charter, and that the purpose of the war was to control the country's oil supplies.

=== Conduct of the Iraq War ===
Articles 9, 10, 11 and 13 deal with conduct of the war, including failing to provide troops with body armor, falsifying US troop deaths and injuries, establishing a permanent military base in Iraq, and creating a secret task force to develop energy and military policies with respect to Iraq and other countries. Articles 15 and 16 cover contractors in Iraq and charges that the president misspent money on contractors and provided them with immunity.

=== Valerie Plame ===
Article 14 is about the revelation of the identity of CIA agent Valerie Plame.

=== Treatment of detainees ===
Articles 17–20 concern the treatment of detainees, the "kidnapping" and detention of foreign nationals, and the use of torture.

=== Attempt to overthrow the government of Iran ===
Article 21 claims that the president misled Congress and the American people about threats from Iran, and supported terrorist organizations within Iran, with the goal of overthrowing the Iranian government.

=== NSA warrantless surveillance controversy ===
Articles 24 and 25 charge the president with illegally spying on American citizens, directing US telecom companies to create databases of citizens, and violating the Fourth Amendment of the US Constitution.

=== Signing statements ===
Article 26 concerns the presidential use of signing statements.

=== Congressional subpoenas ===
Article 27 is about failing to comply with congressional subpoenas.

=== 2004 elections ===
Articles 28 and 29 charge the president with tampering with the 2004 elections and violating the Voting Rights Act of 1965.

=== Medicare ===
Article 30 states "Misleading Congress and the American People in an Attempt to Destroy Medicare."

=== Katrina ===
Article 31 concerns the supposed failure to plan and respond to Hurricane Katrina.

=== Global warming ===
Article 32 charges the president with "Systematically Undermining Efforts to Address Global Climate Change."

=== 9/11 ===
Articles 33, 34 and 35 concern 9/11, alleging that the president failed to respond to prior intelligence, obstructed post-9/11 investigations and endangered the health of 9/11 first responders.

== Political views and actions ==
An early effort to impeach Bush was begun by Lyndon Johnson administration Attorney General Ramsey Clark.

=== Democrats in Congress ===
On June 16, 2005, Rep. John Conyers (D-MI) assembled an unofficial meeting to discuss the Downing Street memo and to consider grounds for impeachment. Conyers filed a resolution on December 18, 2005, to create an investigative committee to consider impeachment. His resolution gained 38 co-sponsors before it expired at the end of the 109th Congress. He did not reintroduce a similar resolution for the 110th Congress.

Keith Ellison (D-MN) was the leading figure behind the resolution to impeach Bush brought to the Minnesota State House of Representatives in May 2006. Ellison was elected to the United States House of Representatives in November 2006. During the campaign and when he was named to the House Judiciary Committee, Ellison repeatedly called for an investigation into a possible impeachment. In support of his candidacy, he "received a $1,000 contribution from ImpeachPAC". Ellison would later note that his "opinions really have not changed over time, but the circumstances" regarding his position in Congress had, and he was a "step before impeachment".

At another unofficial hearing convened by Conyers on January 20, 2006, Rep. Jerrold Nadler (D-NY) called for the committee to explore whether Bush should face impeachment, stemming from his decision to authorize domestic surveillance without court review.

On May 10, 2006, House Minority Leader Nancy Pelosi (D-CA) indicated she was not interested in pursuing impeachment and had taken it "off the table", reiterating this phrase on November 8, 2006, after the election. In July 2007, Pelosi stated that she "would probably advocate" impeaching Bush if she were not in the House nor Speaker of the House.

On December 8, 2006 (the last day of the 109th Congress), then-Representative Cynthia McKinney (D-GA) submitted a resolution, H. Res. 1106. The bill expired along with the 109th Congress.

John Conyers brought up the subject of impeachment on the July 8, 2007, broadcast of This Week with George Stephanopoulos, stating:

We're hoping that as the cries for the removal of both Cheney and Bush now reach 46 percent and 58 percent, respectively, for impeachment, that we could begin to become a little bit more cooperative, if not even amicable, in trying to get to the truth of these matters.

Presidential candidate Dennis Kucinich's major point in the Democratic Presidential Debate on October 30, 2007, was that Bush and Cheney should be impeached for the Iraq War. On November 6, 2007, Kucinich introduced a resolution to impeach Vice President Cheney in the House of Representatives.

In November 2007, Joe Biden, then a candidate for the Democratic presidential nomination in 2008, stated that he would move to impeach if President Bush were to bomb Iran without first gaining congressional approval. However, no such bombing occurred during the rest of Bush's term.

On June 9, 2008, Representative Dennis Kucinich (D-Ohio), introduced a resolution, H.Res. 1258, to impeach president George W. Bush, which included 35 counts in the articles of impeachment. At the end of the evening on June 10, Kucinich offered a motion to refer HRes 1258 to the House Judiciary Committee. On June 11, the House voted 251–166 to send the resolution to the committee. The effort to impeach President Bush was not supported by House Speaker Nancy Pelosi, who believed the move would be "divisive and unlikely to succeed."

On July 14, 2008, Kucinich introduced a new impeachment resolution (H.Res. 1345) limited to a single count.

=== State-level Democratic party actions ===
On March 21, 2006, the New Mexico Democratic Party, at a convention in Albuquerque, adopted a plank to their platform saying “the Democratic Party of New Mexico supports the impeachment of George Bush and his lawful removal from office.”

On March 24, 2007, the Vermont Democratic State Committee voted to support JRH 15, a state legislative resolution supporting impeachment, calling for its passage as "appropriate action."

On January 2, 2008, Betty Hall, an 87-year-old, fourteen-term Democratic State Representative, introduced New Hampshire House Resolution 24 in the State-Federal Relations and Veterans Affairs Committee of the New Hampshire House of Representatives. The resolution was "petitioning Congress to commence impeachment procedures" against Bush and Cheney for "high crimes and misdemeanors", including domestic spying, illegal detentions, signing statements, electioneering, the breaking of international treaties, and war crimes. The bill further asserted that "section 603 of Jefferson's Manual of Parliamentary Practice states that an impeachment may be set in motion by the United States House of Representatives by charges transmitted from the legislature of a state".

On February 20, 2008, the bill was ruled "Inexpedient to Legislate" to pass by a 10 to 5 vote within committee, which passed the resolution on to the full House for a vote. The bill was tabled in the New Hampshire House of Representatives on April 16, 2008. After three efforts to have the bill removed from the table were unsuccessful, it died on the table on September 24, 2008.

=== House Republicans ===
On July 25, 2008, Rep. Mike Pence (IN) said that Bush had not broken the law in his own interest. He further cited the Framers of the Constitution and said that we should use "our own good judgment" regarding their intent on impeachment.

== Municipal and county resolutions endorsing impeachment ==
By early 2006, numerous municipalities (large and small, and in various regions of the United States) had begun considering resolutions endorsing an impeachment of Bush. By June 2007, 79 municipal governments had adopted resolutions expressing their support for impeachments against Bush and other Bush administration officials.

Several county governments adopted resolutions expressing their support for an impeachment of Bush. Among the first to do this was Dane County, Wisconsin in August 2007.

== Summary of impeachment resolutions introduced ==
Impeachment resolutions introduced in the 109th U.S. Congress
Resolution #	Date introduced	Sponsor	Number of co-sponsors	Action called for	Reason	Actions taken	Ref.
H.Res. 635	December 18, 2005	John Conyers (D–MI)	38	Launch of an impeachment inquiry	Allegations against the Bush administration including, "intent to go to war before congressional authorization, manipulation of pre-war intelligence, encouraging and countenancing torture, retaliating against critics"	Referred to House Committee on Rules on December 18, 2005	
H.Res.1106	December 8, 2006	Cynthia McKinney (D–GA)	0	Impeachment of Bush	Alleged "high crimes and misdemeanors" outlined in three articles of impeachment: Article I: "Failure to preserve, protect, and defend the Constitution," in violation of his oath of office by, "manipulating intelligence and lying to justify war"; Article II: "Abuse of office and of executive privilege," in violation of his oath of office, through, "disregard for that oath by obstructing and hindering the work of Congressional investigative bodies and by seeking to expand the scope of the powers of his office," and additionally, failing to, "investigate or discipline those responsible for an ongoing pattern of negligence, incompetence and malfeasance to the detriment of the American people (including by Vice President Dick Cheney and National Security Advisor Condoleezza Rice); Article III:"Failure to ensure the laws are faithfully executed," in violation of his duties under Article II, Section 3 of the United States Constitution by having, "violated the letter and spirit of laws and rules of criminal procedure used by civilian and military courts, and has violated or ignored regulatory codes and practices that carry out the law," in conduct including, "illegal domestic spying," that is, "in violation of the Foreign Intelligence Surveillance Act"	Referred to House Committee on the Judiciary on December 8, 2006	

Impeachment resolutions introduced in the 110th U.S. Congress
Resolution #	Date introduced	Sponsor	Number of co-sponsors	Action called for	Reason	Actions taken	Ref.
H.Res.1258	June 11, 2008	Dennis Kucinich (D–OH)	11	Impeachment of Bush	Alleged "high crimes and misdemeanors" in violation of his oath of office outlined in 28 articles of impeachment	Referred (by a vote of 251–166) to House Committee on the Judiciary on June 11, 2008	
H.Res.1345	July 15, 2008	Dennis Kucinich (D–OH)	4	Impeachment of Bush	"Deceiving Congress with fabricated threats of Iraq WMDs to fraudulently obtain support for an authorization of the use of military force against Iraq"	Referred (by a vote of 238–180) to House Committee on the Judiciary on December 8, 2006	

== See also ==
- Impeach Blair campaign
- Impeachment of Bill Clinton
- Efforts to impeach Barack Obama
- Efforts to impeach Dick Cheney
- Efforts to impeach Donald Trump
- Efforts to impeach Joe Biden
- Impeachment investigations of United States federal officials
- U.S. presidential impeachment
- Fahrenheit 9/11
- Let's Impeach the President
- Worse than Watergate
