= Efforts to impeach Barack Obama =

Talks and activities of a possible impeachment of Barack Obama

President Obama

During Barack Obama's tenure as President of the United States from 2009 to 2017, certain Republican members of Congress, as well as Democratic congressman Dennis Kucinich, stated that Obama had engaged in impeachable activity and that he might face attempts to remove him from office. Rationales offered for possible impeachment ranged from Obama allowing people to use bathrooms based on their gender identity, to the 2012 Benghazi attack, to Obama's enforcement of immigration laws, and false claims that he was born outside the United States.

The closest attempt to impeach Obama occurred on December 3, 2013. On this date, the House Judiciary Committee, controlled by Republicans, held a hearing on whether or not to impeach the president. At the hearing, there were views among Republicans that the president had not done his duty, while simultaneously abusing his executive power. The hearing was attended by Georgetown University law professor Nicholas Quinn Rosenkranz who encouraged impeachment claiming it was a good check on what he perceived as "executive lawlessness" from Obama. Impeachment efforts never advanced past this, mainly due to consistent opposition from Speaker of the United States House of Representatives John Boehner who saw impeachment as politically harmful to congressional Republicans, as well as the near-unanimous consensus that impeachment would not lead to Obama's removal in a senate trial rendering such efforts a waste of time. No list of articles of impeachment was ever drawn up and proposed to the Judiciary Committee for Obama. Obama was the first president since Jimmy Carter to not have any articles of impeachment referred against him to the House Judiciary Committee.

Multiple surveys of U.S. public opinion found that a near supermajority of Americans rejected the idea of impeaching Obama, though a bit more than a simple majority of Republicans did support such efforts. For example, CNN found in July 2014 that 57% of Republicans supported impeachment, but in general, 65% of American adults, disagreed with impeachment with only 33% supporting such efforts.

== Congressional calls for impeachment ==
In October 2010, prior to the elections in which Republicans won control of the House, Jonathan Chait published an article in The New Republic called "Scandal TBD" where he predicted that if Republicans were to win control of the House, and Barack Obama were to win re-election in 2012, the Republicans would try to impeach Obama and use any reason possible as pretext.

=== Joe Sestak ===
In May 2010, Republican Darrell Issa of California stated that the allegation that the White House had offered Pennsylvania Representative Joe Sestak a job to persuade Sestak to drop out of the Pennsylvania Senate primary election against Arlen Specter "is one that everyone from Arlen Spector [sic] to Dick Morris has said is in fact a crime, and could be impeachable". With the possibility of becoming chairman of the House Committee on Oversight and Government Reform in January 2011, Issa said in October 2010 that the committee would not seek to impeach Obama.

=== Preventing Obama from "pushing his agenda" ===
In August 2011, Republican Congressman Michael C. Burgess of Texas agreed with a rally audience member that the impeachment of Obama "needs to happen" in order to prevent Obama from "pushing his agenda". Burgess did not mention any grounds for impeachment.

=== Obama administration immigration policy ===
In June 2012, Senator Jon Kyl mentioned impeachment when discussing the Obama administration policy on immigration. He said on the Bill Bennett radio show, "if it’s bad enough and if shenanigans [are] involved in it, then of course impeachment is always a possibility. But I don’t think at this point anybody is talking about that".

In August 2013, Republican Senator Tom Coburn of Oklahoma responded to a questioner in a town hall meeting, who had asserted that Obama was failing to carry out his constitutional responsibilities, by saying that "you have to establish the criteria that would qualify for proceedings against the president... and that's called impeachment". Coburn added, "I don't have the legal background to know if that rises to 'high crimes and misdemeanors', but I think you're getting perilously close". Coburn did not specify what grounds he felt would support impeachment, but NBC News noted that Coburn "mentioned that he believes Department of Homeland Security officials have told career USCIS employees to 'ignore' background checks for immigrants". Coburn mentioned no evidence that substantiated his belief.

=== Use of drones ===
In March 2012, Republican Representative Walter B. Jones introduced H. Con. Res. 107, calling for Congress to hold the sentiment that certain actions of Obama be considered as impeachable offenses, including the CIA's drone program in Afghanistan and Pakistan. The resolution died in the House Judiciary Committee.

=== Libya intervention ===
In March 2011, Democratic House Representative Dennis Kucinich called for Obama's impeachment after Obama authorized air strikes against Libya during the Libyan Civil War.

=== Benghazi attack ===
In May 2013, Republican Senator James Inhofe of Oklahoma stated that Obama could be impeached over what he alleged was a White House cover-up after the deadly attack against two United States government facilities in Benghazi, Libya on September 11, 2012. Inhofe said that "of all the great cover-ups in history—the Pentagon papers, Iran-Contra, Watergate, all the rest of them—this ... is going to go down as most egregious cover-up in American history". Republican Congressman Jason Chaffetz of Utah also stated in an interview that impeachment was "within the realm of possibilities" with regard to the September 11, 2012, attack in Benghazi, later clarifying that "it's not something I'm seeking" and that "I'm not willing to take that off the table. But that's certainly not what we're striving for." Fox News host Jeanine Pirro called for Obama's impeachment over Benghazi.

=== The Affordable Care Act ===
In 2013, Senator Ted Cruz responded to the question "Why Don’t We Impeach [Obama]?" with "Good question... and I’ll tell you the simplest answer: To successfully impeach a president you need the votes in the U.S. Senate." That year, when asked if Obama had committed impeachable offenses on immigration and health care, Cruz said the implementation of the Affordable Care Act was "lawless", and said of impeachment, "That’s a question for the House ultimately... My responsibility would be to render judgment."

=== Birtherism ===
At a 2013 town hall meeting with constituents, two years after Obama had released his long-form birth certificate to the public, Congressman Blake Farenthold said that Obama should be impeached due to birther conspiracy theories about Obama. Farenthold said that he thinks that "the House is already out of the barn on this, on the whole birth certificate issue."

=== IRS targeting controversy ===
On August 19, 2013, Republican Congressman Kerry Bentivolio stated that if he could write articles of impeachment, "it would be a dream come true". To help in achieving that goal, he retained experts and historians. During the same interview, Bentivolio called the press "the most corrupt thing in Washington," and said that he was looking to tie the White House to the IRS targeting controversy "as evidence of impeachment [sic]".

=== Debt ceiling crisis ===
During the debt ceiling crisis of 2013, which was the result of Republicans refusing to raise the debt ceiling unless Obama agreed to defund the Affordable Care Act, House Representative Louie Gohmert said it would be an "impeachable offense" of the United States as a result of the crisis.

=== "President's Constitutional Duty to Faithfully Execute the Laws" ===
On December 3, 2013, the House Judiciary committee held a hearing formally titled "The President's Constitutional Duty to Faithfully Execute the Laws", which some participants and observers viewed as an attempt to begin justifying impeachment proceedings. Asked if the hearing was about impeachment, the committee chairman responded that it was not, adding, "I didn't mention impeachment nor did any of the witnesses in response to my questions at the Judiciary Committee hearing." Contrary to his claims however, a witness did mention impeachment rather blatantly. Partisan Georgetown University law professor Nicholas Quinn Rosenkranz said, “A check on executive lawlessness is impeachment” as he accused Obama of “claim[ing] the right of the king to essentially stand above the law.”

=== Prisoner swap ===
The convention of the South Dakota Republican Party voted in a 196-176 resolution to call for the impeachment of Obama based on his action to release five detainees from Guantanamo Bay detention camp in order to free Bowe Bergdahl from his Taliban captors. Congressmember Allen West expressed the view that the prisoner exchange that brought the release of Bowe Bergdahl was grounds for impeachment. John Dean, former White House Counsel to Richard Nixon, criticized the movement to impeach Obama as "insanity," arguing that Republican demands for impeachment are grounded in political disagreements rather than actual impeachable offenses. "Partisans promoting and pushing impeachment as a political solution to being out of power seem to forget that what comes around goes around. These people are not conservatives, who by definition seek to protect the system; rather they are radicals who are gaming our constitutional system," he wrote.

=== Transgender bathroom directive ===
In May 2016, the Oklahoma Legislature filed a measure asking the representatives from Oklahoma in the House of Representatives to impeach Obama, the U.S. attorney general, the U.S. secretary of education and any other administration officials involved in the decision to allow transgender students to use the bathrooms corresponding to their gender identity, alleging that these federal officials had exceeded their constitutional authority by issuing a directive to state schools. The same resolution also "condemns the actions of the Civil Rights Division of the United States Department of Justice and the Office for Civil Rights of the United States Department of Education ... as contrary to the values of the citizens of Oklahoma".

== Congressional opposition to impeachment ==
A number of prominent Republicans rejected calls for impeachment, including House Speaker John Boehner, and Sen. John McCain. McCain said impeachment would be a distraction from the 2014 election, and that if "we regain control of the United States Senate we can be far more effective than an effort to impeach the president, which has no chance of succeeding." Rep. Blake Farenthold said that impeachment would be "an exercise in futility."

== Public debate over impeachment demands ==
In terms of background, U.S. public opinion widely opposed efforts made to impeach previous Presidents Bill Clinton and George W. Bush. CNN Polling Director Keating Holland has stated that their organization found that 69% opposed impeaching President Bush in 2006.

According to a July 2014 YouGov poll, 35% of Americans believed President Obama should be impeached, including 68% of Republicans. Later that month, a CNN survey found that about two thirds of adult Americans disagreed with impeachment efforts. The data showed intense partisan divides, with 57% of Republicans supporting the efforts compared to only 35% of independents and 13% of Democrats.

On July 8, 2014, the former governor of Alaska and 2008 Republican vice presidential nominee Sarah Palin publicly called for Obama's impeachment for "purposeful dereliction of duty". In a full statement, she said: "It’s time to impeach; and on behalf of American workers and legal immigrants of all backgrounds, we should vehemently oppose any politician on the left or right who would hesitate in voting for articles of impeachment."

Andrew McCarthy of the National Review wrote the book Faithless Execution: Building the Political Case for Obama's Impeachment, which argued that threatening impeachment was a good way to limit executive action by Obama (McCarthy referred to Obama's actions as "the standard dictatorial self-image").

In 2018, conservative radio talk show host Larry Elder said that Obama should have been impeached for withdrawing U.S. military forces from Iraq in 2011 under what Elder said was the "new standard for impeachment in the Trump era."

== See also ==
- Impeachment investigations of United States federal officials
- Timeline of the investigation into the 2012 Benghazi attack
- United States House of Representatives v. Azar
- Impeachment of Bill Clinton
- Efforts to impeach Donald Trump
- Efforts to impeach George W. Bush
- Efforts to impeach Dick Cheney
- Efforts to impeach Joe Biden
