= Federal impeachment in the United States =

Procedure of officially accusing a civil officer

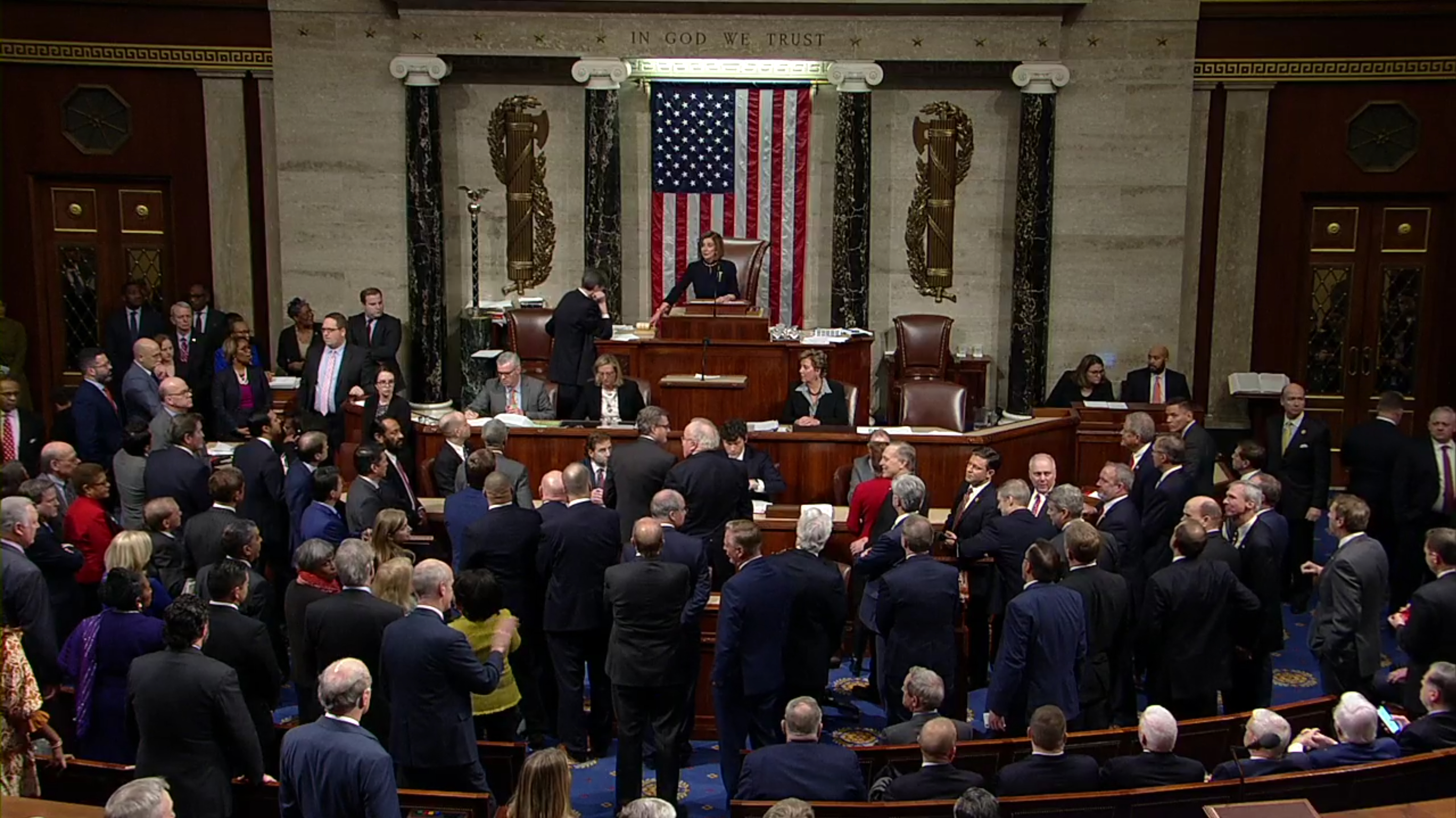
Members of the House of Representatives vote on the articles of impeachment for the first impeachment of Donald Trump.

In the United States, federal impeachment is the process by which the House of Representatives charges the president, vice president, or another civil federal officer for alleged misconduct. The House can impeach an individual with a simple majority of the present members or other criteria adopted by the House according to Article One, Section 2, Clause 5 of the U.S. Constitution.

Most impeachments have involved alleged crimes committed while in office, but there is no requirement for the misconduct to be an indictable crime. Some officials have been impeached and convicted for crimes committed before taking office, and there have been instances where a former official was tried after leaving office. The official who is impeached may continue to serve their term until a trial leads to a judgment that directs their removal from office or until they leave office through other means, such as resignation. A two-thirds majority of the U.S. Senators present at the trial is required for conviction under Article One, Section 3, Clause 6 of the Constitution.

The nature of the impeachment proceedings is remedial rather than punitive, with the only remedy being removal from office. Since all officers in the federal government are confirmed in the Senate, officers appointed under the Appointments Clause of the Constitution may also be disqualified from holding any other appointed office under the United States in the future. As the process is not punitive, an individual may also be subject to criminal or civil trial, prosecution, and conviction under the law after removal from office. Additionally, the president is constitutionally barred from pardoning an impeached and convicted person to protect them from the consequences of a conviction in an impeachment trial, as the conviction itself is not a punishment.

== Constitutional provisions ==
Article I, Section 2, Clause 5 of the United States Constitution provides:

The House of Representatives shall choose their Speaker and other Officers; and shall have the sole Power of Impeachment.

Article I, Section 3, Clauses 6 and 7 provide:

The Senate shall have the sole Power to try all Impeachments. When sitting for that Purpose, they shall be on Oath or Affirmation. When the President of the United States is tried, the Chief Justice shall preside: And no Person shall be convicted without the Concurrence of two-thirds of the Members present. Judgment in Cases of Impeachment shall not extend further than to removal from Office, and disqualification to hold and enjoy any Office of honor, Trust or Profit under the United States; but the Party convicted shall nevertheless be liable and subject to Indictment, Trial, Judgment and Punishment, according to Law.

Article II, Section 2 provides:

[The President] ... shall have power to grant reprieves and pardons for offenses against the United States, except in cases of impeachment.

Article II, Section 4 provides:

The President, Vice President and all civil Officers of the United States, shall be removed from Office on Impeachment for, and Conviction of, Treason, Bribery, or other high Crimes and Misdemeanors.

== Impeachable offenses ==
The Constitution limits grounds of impeachment to "Treason, Bribery, or other high Crimes and Misdemeanors", but does not itself define "high crimes and misdemeanors".

=== Types of misconduct ===
Congressional materials have cautioned that the grounds for impeachment "do not all fit neatly and logically into categories" because the remedy of impeachment is intended to "reach a broad variety of conduct by officers that is both serious and incompatible with the duties of the office". Congress has identified three general types of conduct that constitute grounds for impeachment, although these categories should not be understood as exhaustive:

1. Improperly exceeding or abusing the powers of the office;
2. Behavior incompatible with the function and purpose of the office; and
3. Misusing the office for an improper purpose or for personal gain.

=== High crimes and misdemeanors ===
"High crimes and misdemeanors", in the legal and common parlance of England in the 17th and 18th centuries, is corrupt activity by those who have special duties that are not shared with common persons. Toward the end of the 18th century, "high crimes and misdemeanors" acquired a more technical meaning. As Blackstone says in his Commentaries: "The first and principal high misdemeanor ... was mal-administration of such high offices as are in public trust and employment."

The phrase "high crimes and misdemeanors" was a common phrase when the U.S. Constitution was written and did not require any stringent or difficult criteria for determining guilt, but meant the opposite. The crimes are called "high crimes" because they are carried out by a person in a position of public authority, or by misusing the position of public authority they have been given. It does not mean that the crimes themselves are unusual or "higher" types of crime. The phrase was historically used to cover a very broad range of crimes. In 1974 the Senate's Judiciary Committee's stated that "'High Crimes and Misdemeanors' has traditionally been considered a 'term of art', like such other constitutional phrases as 'levying war' and 'due process'."

Several commentators have suggested that Congress alone may decide for itself what constitutes a "high Crime or Misdemeanor", especially since the Supreme Court decided in Nixon v. United States that it did not have the authority to determine whether the Senate properly "tried" a defendant. In 1970, then-House Minority Leader Gerald R. Ford defined the criterion as he saw it: "An impeachable offense is whatever a majority of the House of Representatives considers it to be at a given moment in history."

=== Historical examples ===
Of the 22 impeachments voted by the House:

- No official has been charged with treason.
- Three officials have been charged with bribery:
  - Robert W. Archbald – tried, removed
  - Alcee Hastings – tried, removed
  - William W. Belknap – resigned prior to impeachment, later acquitted
- The remaining charges against all the other officials fall under the category of "high Crimes and Misdemeanors".

=== Standard of proof ===
The standard of proof required for impeachment and conviction is left to the discretion of individual representatives and senators, respectively. Defendants have argued that impeachment trials are in the nature of criminal proceedings, with convictions carrying grave consequences for the accused, and that therefore proof beyond a reasonable doubt should be the applicable standard. House Managers have argued that a lower standard would be appropriate to better serve the purpose of defending the community against abuse of power, since the defendant does not risk forfeiture of life, liberty, or property, for which the reasonable doubt standard was set.

=== Criminal vs non-criminal activity ===
In drawing up articles of impeachment, the House has placed little emphasis on criminal conduct. Less than one-third of the articles that the House have adopted have explicitly charged the violation of a criminal statute or used the word "criminal" or "crime" to describe the alleged conduct. Officials have been impeached and removed for drunkenness, biased decision-making, or inducing parties to enter financial transactions, none of which is specifically criminal. Two of the articles against President Andrew Johnson were based on rude speech that reflected badly on the office: President Johnson had made "harangues" criticizing the Congress and questioning its legislative authority, refusing to follow laws, and diverting funds allocated in an army appropriations act, each of which brought the presidency "into contempt, ridicule, and disgrace". A number of individuals have been impeached for behavior incompatible with the nature of the office they hold. Some impeachments have addressed, at least in part, conduct before the individuals assumed their positions: for example, Article IV against Judge Thomas Porteous related to false statements to the FBI and Senate in connection with his nomination and confirmation to the court.

Conversely, not all criminal conduct is arguably impeachable: in 1974, the Judiciary Committee rejected an article of impeachment against President Nixon alleging that he committed tax fraud, primarily because that "related to the President's private conduct, not to an abuse of his authority as President".

== Debate regarding impeachable officials ==
The Constitution gives Congress the authority to impeach and remove "The President, Vice President, and all civil Officers of the United States" upon a determination that such officers have engaged in treason, bribery, or other high crimes and misdemeanors. The Constitution does not articulate who qualifies as a "civil Officer of the United States".

In 1970, Representative Gerald R. Ford (R-MI), who was then House minority leader, called for the House to impeach Supreme Court Justice William O. Douglas. However, a House investigation led by Congressman Emanuel Celler (D-NY) determined that Ford's allegations were baseless. According to Professor Joshua E. Kastenberg at the University of New Mexico School of Law, Ford and Nixon sought to force Douglas off the Court in order to cement the "Southern strategy" as well as to provide cover for the invasion of Cambodia.

Within the executive branch, any "principal Officer" appointed by the president, including a head of an agency such as a Secretary, Administrator, or Commissioner, is a "civil Officer of the United States" subject to impeachment. There has, however, been debate as to whether Congress may impeach a lower-level official. Archibald Maclaine, a delegate to the North Carolina ratifying convention, stated, “[i]t appears to me ... the most horrid ignorance to suppose that every officer, however trifling his office, is to be impeached for every petty offense ... I hope every gentleman ... must see plainly that impeachments cannot extend to inferior officers of the United States.” On the other hand, Supreme Court Justice Joseph Story wrote, “all officers of the United States [] who hold their appointments under the national government, whether their duties are executive or judicial, in the highest or in the lowest departments of the government, with the exception of officers in the army and navy, are properly civil officers within the meaning of the constitution, and liable to impeachment.”

The Senate concluded in 1798 that members of Congress (representatives and senators) are not "civil Officers" for purposes of impeachment. As a practical matter, expulsion is effected by the simpler procedures of Article I, Section 5, which provides "Each House shall be the Judge of the Elections, Returns and Qualifications of its own Members ... Each House may determine the Rules of its Proceedings, punish its Members for disorderly Behavior, and, with the Concurrence of two thirds, expel a Member" (see List of United States senators expelled or censured and List of United States representatives expelled, censured, or reprimanded). This allows each House to expel its own members without involving the other chamber. In 1797, the House of Representatives impeached Senator William Blount of Tennessee. The Senate expelled Senator Blount under Article I, Section 5, on the same day. However, the impeachment proceeding remained pending. After four days of debate, the Senate concluded that a Senator is not a "civil Officer of the United States" for purposes of the Impeachment Clause, and dismissed for lack of jurisdiction. The House has not impeached a Member of Congress since.

The constitutional text is silent on whether an officer can be tried after the officer resigns or his/her term ends. However, when the issue has arisen, the House has been willing to impeach after resignation, and the Senate has been willing to try the official after resignation. As noted, the Senate continued impeachment proceedings against William Blount after he had been expelled from office, dismissing the proceedings only after determining that a Senator is not a "civil Officer of the United States". In 1876, William W. Belknap was impeached by the House of Representatives hours after resigning as United States Secretary of War. The Senate held by a 37–29 vote that it had jurisdiction to try Belknap notwithstanding his resignation, and ultimately acquitted him after trial. The permissibility of trying a former official was a major issue in the second impeachment trial of Donald Trump, which commenced 20 days after Trump's term in office expired, although Trump's Trump's impeachment itself occurred while he was president. By a 55–45 vote, the Senate rejected a motion asserting that the trial was unconstitutional.

The Constitution does not limit the number of times an individual may be impeached. As of January 2024, Donald Trump is the only federal officer to have been impeached more than once.

== Procedure ==
At the federal level, the impeachment process is typically a three-step procedure. The first phase is typically an impeachment inquiry, though this is not a required stage. The two stages constitutionally required for removal are impeachment by the House of Representatives and trial by the United States Senate.

- First, the House investigates through an impeachment inquiry.
- Second, the House of Representatives must pass, by a simple majority of those present and voting, articles of impeachment, which constitute the formal allegation or allegations. Upon passage, the defendant has been "impeached".
- Third, the Senate tries the accused. In the case of the impeachment of a president, the chief justice of the United States presides over the proceedings. For the impeachment of any other official, the Constitution is silent on who shall preside, suggesting that this role falls to the Senate's usual presiding officer, the president of the Senate, who is also the vice president of the United States. Conviction in the Senate requires the concurrence of a two-thirds supermajority of those present. The result of conviction is removal from office and (optionally, in a separate vote) disqualification from holding any federal office in the future, which requires a concurrence of only a majority of senators present.

=== Rules ===
A number of rules have been adopted by the House and Senate and are honored by tradition.

Jefferson's Manual, which is integral to the Rules of the House of Representatives, states that impeachment is set in motion by charges made on the floor, charges proffered by a memorial, a member's resolution referred to a committee, a message from the president, or from facts developed and reported by an investigating committee of the House. It further states that a proposition to impeach is a question of high privilege in the House and at once supersedes business otherwise in order under the rules governing the order of business.

The House Practice: A Guide to the Rules, Precedents and Procedures of the House is a reference source for information on the rules and selected precedents governing the House procedure, prepared by the House Parliamentarian. The manual has a chapter on the House's rules, procedures, and precedent for impeachment.

In 1974, as part of the preliminary investigation in the Nixon impeachment inquiry, the staff of the Impeachment Inquiry of the House Judiciary Committee prepared a report, Constitutional Grounds for Presidential Impeachment. The primary focus of the Report is the definition of the term "high Crimes and Misdemeanors" and the relationship to criminality, which the Report traces through history from English roots, through the debates at the 1787 Constitutional Convention, and the history of the impeachments before 1974.

The 1974 report has been expanded and revised on several occasions by the Congressional Research Service, and the current version Impeachment and Removal dates from October 2015. While this document is only staff recommendation, as a practical matter, today it is probably the single most influential definition of "high Crimes and Misdemeanors".

The Senate has formal Rules and Procedures of Practice in the Senate When Sitting on Impeachment Trials.

=== Calls for impeachment, and Congressional power to investigate ===
While the actual impeachment of a federal public official is rare, demands for impeachment, especially of presidents, are common, going back to the administration of George Washington in the mid-1790s.

While almost all of them were abandoned as soon as they were introduced, several did have their intended effect. Treasury Secretary Andrew Mellon and Supreme Court Justice Abe Fortas both resigned in response to the threat of impeachment hearings, and most famously, President Richard Nixon resigned from office after the House Judiciary Committee had already reported articles of impeachment to the floor.

In advance of the formal resolution by the full House to authorize proceedings, committee chairmen have the same power for impeachment as for any other issue within the jurisdiction of the committee: to investigate, subpoena witnesses, and prepare a preliminary report of findings. For example:

- In 1970, House minority leader Gerald R. Ford attempted to initiate impeachment proceedings against Associate Justice William O. Douglas; the attempt included a 90-minute speech on the House floor. The House did not vote to initiate proceedings.
- In 1973, the Senate Watergate hearings (with testimony from John Dean, and the revelation of the White House tapes by Alexander Butterfield) were held in May and June 1973, and the House Judiciary Committee authorized Chairman Rodino to commence an investigation, with subpoena power, on October 30, 1973. The full House voted to initiate impeachment proceedings on February 6, 1974, that is, after nine months of formal investigations by various Congressional committees.
- Other examples are discussed in the article on Impeachment investigations of United States federal officials.

Targets of congressional investigations have challenged the power of Congress to investigate before a formal resolution commences impeachment proceedings. For example, President Buchanan wrote to the committee investigating his administration:

I do, therefore, ... solemnly protest against these proceedings of the House of Representatives, because they are in violation of the rights of the coordinate executive branch of the Government, and subversive of its constitutional independence; because they are calculated to foster a band of interested parasites and informers, ever ready, for their own advantage, to swear before ex parte committees to pretended private conversations between the President and themselves, incapable, from their nature, of being disproved; thus furnishing material for harassing him, degrading him in the eyes of the country ...

He maintained that the House of Representatives possessed no general powers to investigate him, except when sitting as an impeaching body.

When the Supreme Court has considered similar issues, it held that the power to secure "needed information ... has long been treated as an attribute of the power to legislate. ... [The power to investigate is deeply rooted in the nation's history:] It was so regarded in the British Parliament and in the colonial Legislatures before the American Revolution, and a like view has prevailed and been carried into effect in both houses of Congress and in most of the state Legislatures." The Supreme Court also held, "There can be no doubt as to the power of Congress, by itself or through its committees, to investigate matters and conditions relating to contemplated legislation."

The Supreme Court considered the power of the Congress to investigate, and to subpoena executive branch officials, in a pair of cases arising out of alleged corruption in the administration of President Warren G. Harding. In the first, McGrain v. Daugherty, the Court considered a subpoena issued to the brother of Attorney General Harry Daugherty for bank records relevant to the Senate's investigation into the Department of Justice. Concluding that the subpoena was valid, the Court explained that Congress's "power of inquiry ... is an essential and appropriate auxiliary to the legislative function", as "[a] legislative body cannot legislate wisely or effectively in the absence of information respecting the conditions which the legislation is intended to affect or change." The Supreme Court held that it was irrelevant that the Senate's authorizing resolution lacked an "avow[al] that legislative action was had in view" because, said the Court, "the subject to be investigated was ... [p]lainly [a] subject ... on which legislation could be had" and such legislation "would be materially aided by the information which the investigation was calculated to elicit." Although "[a]n express avowal" of the Senate's legislative objective "would have been better", the Court admonished that "the presumption should be indulged that [legislation] was the real object."

Two years later, in Sinclair v. United States, the Court considered investigation of private parties involved with officials under potential investigation for public corruption. In Sinclair, Harry F. Sinclair, the president of an oil company, appealed his conviction for refusing to answer a Senate committee's questions regarding his company's allegedly fraudulent lease on federal oil reserves at Teapot Dome in Wyoming. The Court, acknowledging individuals' "right to be exempt from all unauthorized, arbitrary or unreasonable inquiries and disclosures in respect of their personal and private affairs", nonetheless explained that because "[i]t was a matter of concern to the United States, ... the transaction purporting to lease to [Sinclair's company] the lands within the reserve cannot be said to be merely or principally ... personal." The Court also dismissed the suggestion that the Senate was impermissibly conducting a criminal investigation. "It may be conceded that Congress is without authority to compel disclosures for the purpose of aiding the prosecution of pending suits, but the authority of that body, directly or through its committees, to require pertinent disclosures in aid of its own constitutional power is not abridged because the information sought to be elicited may also be of use in such suits."

The Supreme Court reached similar conclusions in a number of other cases. In Barenblatt v. United States, the Court permitted Congress to punish contempt, when a person refused to answer questions while testifying under subpoena by the House Committee on Un-American Activities. The Court explained that although "Congress may not constitutionally require an individual to disclose his ... private affairs except in relation to ... a valid legislative purpose", such a purpose was present. Congress's "wide power to legislate in the field of Communist activity ... and to conduct appropriate investigations in aid thereof[] is hardly debatable", said the Court, and "[s]o long as Congress acts in pursuance of its constitutional power, the Judiciary lacks authority to intervene on the basis of the motives which spurred the exercise of that power."

Presidents have often been the subjects of Congress's legislative investigations. For example, in 1832, the House vested a select committee with subpoena power "to inquire whether an attempt was made by the late Secretary of War ... [to] fraudulently [award] ... a contract for supplying rations" to Native Americans and to "further ... inquire whether the President ... had any knowledge of such attempted fraud, and whether he disapproved or approved of the same." In the 1990s, first the House and Senate Banking Committees and then a Senate special committee investigated President and Mrs. Clinton's involvement in the Whitewater land deal and related matters. The Senate had an enabling resolution; the House did not.

The Supreme Court has also explained that Congress has not only the power, but the duty, to investigate so it can inform the public of the operations of government:

It is the proper duty of a representative body to look diligently into every affair of government and to talk much about what it sees. It is meant to be the eyes and the voice, and to embody the wisdom and will of its constituents. Unless Congress have and use every means of acquainting itself with the acts and the disposition of the administrative agents of the government, the country must be helpless to learn how it is being served; and unless Congress both scrutinize these things and sift them by every form of discussion, the country must remain in embarrassing, crippling ignorance of the very affairs which it is most important that it should understand and direct. The informing function of Congress should be preferred even to its legislative function.

=== Impeachment proceedings in the House of Representatives ===
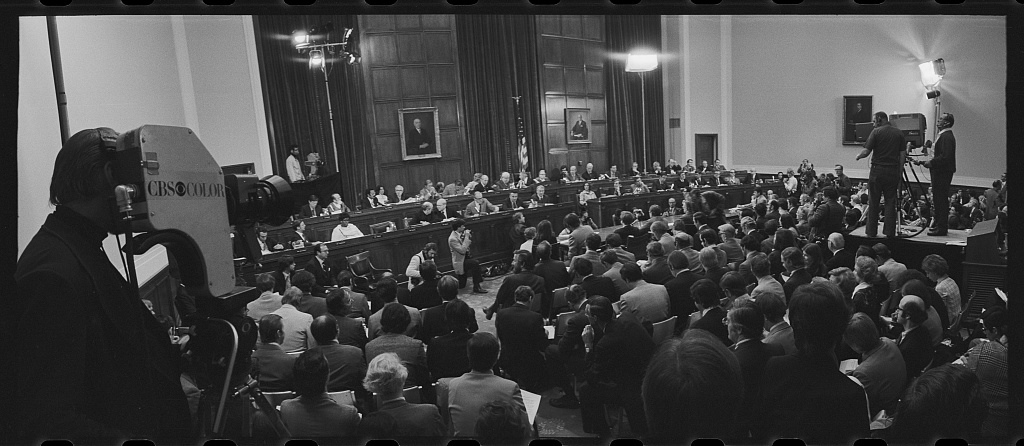
First day of the Judiciary Committee's formal impeachment hearings against President Nixon, May 9, 1974

Impeachment proceedings may be requested by a member of the House of Representatives, either by presenting a list of the charges under oath or by asking for referral to the appropriate committee. The impeachment process may be requested by non-members. For example, when the Judicial Conference of the United States suggests a federal judge be impeached, a charge of actions constituting grounds for impeachment may come from a special prosecutor, the president, or state or territorial legislature, grand jury, or by petition. An impeachment proceeding formally begins with a resolution adopted by the full House of Representative.

An impeachment resolution may first pass through a House committee before the full House votes on it. The type of impeachment resolution determines the committee to which it is referred. A resolution impeaching a particular individual is typically referred to the House Committee on the Judiciary. A resolution to authorize an investigation regarding impeachable conduct is referred to the House Committee on Rules, and then to the Judiciary Committee. The House Committee on the Judiciary, by majority vote, will determine whether grounds for impeachment exist (this vote is not law and is not required, US Constitution and US law).

Either as part of the impeachment resolution or separately specific grounds and allegations of for impeachment will be outlined in one or more articles of impeachment.

The House debates the resolution and may at the conclusion consider the resolution as a whole or vote on each article of impeachment individually. A simple majority of those present and voting is required for each article for the resolution as a whole to pass. If the House votes to impeach, managers (typically referred to as "House managers", with a "lead House manager") are selected to present the case to the Senate. Recently, managers have been selected by resolution, while historically the House would occasionally elect the managers or pass a resolution allowing the appointment of managers at the discretion of the Speaker of the United States House of Representatives. These managers are roughly the equivalent of the prosecution or district attorney in a standard criminal trial. Also, the House will adopt a resolution in order to notify the Senate of its action. After receiving the notice, the Senate will adopt an order notifying the House that it is ready to receive the managers. The House managers then appear before the bar of the Senate and exhibit the articles of impeachment. After the reading of the charges, the managers return and make a verbal report to the House.

=== Trial in the Senate ===
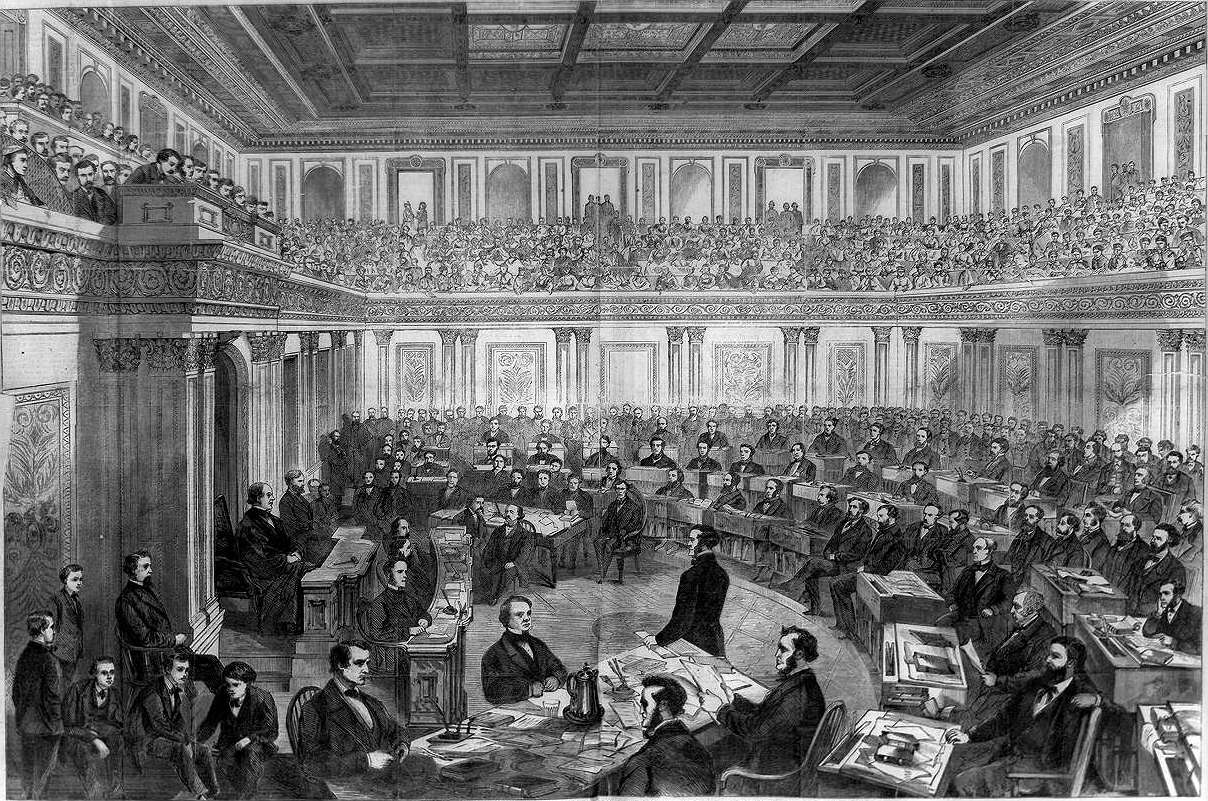
Depiction of the impeachment trial of President Andrew Johnson in 1868, Chief Justice Salmon P. Chase presiding

There is no timeframe requirement for when the managers must actually deliver the articles of impeachment to the Senate. On the set date, senators are sworn in for the impeachment trial.

The proceedings take the form of a trial, with the Senate having the right to call witnesses and each side having the right to perform cross-examinations. The House members, who are given the collective title of managers during the trial, present the prosecution case, and the impeached official has the right to mount a defense with their own attorneys as well. Senators must also take an oath or affirmation that they will perform their duties honestly and with due diligence. After hearing the charges, the Senate usually deliberates in private. The Constitution requires a two-thirds supermajority to convict a person being impeached. The Senate enters judgment on its decision, whether that be to convict or acquit, and a copy of the judgment is filed with the Secretary of State.

Upon conviction in the Senate, the official is automatically removed from office and may by a separate vote also be barred from holding future office. The Senate trial is not an actual criminal proceeding and more closely resembles a civil service termination appeal in terms of the contemplated deprivation. Therefore, the removed official may still be liable to criminal prosecution under a subsequent criminal proceeding. The president may not grant a pardon in the impeachment case, but may in any resulting federal criminal case (unless it is the president who is convicted and thus loses the pardon power). However, whether the president can self-pardon for criminal offenses is an open question, which has never been reviewed by a court.

Beginning in the 1980s with Harry E. Claiborne, the Senate began using "Impeachment Trial Committees" pursuant to Senate Rule XI. These committees presided over the evidentiary phase of the trials, hearing the evidence and supervising the examination and cross-examination of witnesses. The committees would then compile the evidentiary record and present it to the Senate; all senators would then have the opportunity to review the evidence before the chamber voted to convict or acquit. The purpose of the committees was to streamline impeachment trials, which otherwise would have taken up a great deal of the chamber's time. Defendants challenged the use of these committees, claiming them to be a violation of their fair trial rights as this did not meet the constitutional requirement for their cases to be "tried by the Senate". Several impeached judges, including District Court Judge Walter Nixon, sought court intervention in their impeachment proceedings on these grounds. In Nixon v. United States (1993), the Supreme Court determined that the federal judiciary could not review such proceedings, as matters related to impeachment trials are political questions and could not be resolved in the courts.

In the case of impeachment of the president, the Chief Justice of the Supreme Court presides over the trial. During the second impeachment trial of Donald Trump, some Senate Republicans argued that the Chief Justice was required to preside, even though Trump was no longer the President when the trial began. However, by a 55–45 vote, the Senate rejected a motion asserting that the trial was unconstitutional. The trial was presided over by President pro tempore Patrick Leahy.

The Constitution is silent about who would preside in the case of the impeachment of a vice president. It is doubtful the vice president would be permitted to preside over their own trial. As president of the Senate, the vice president would preside over other impeachments. If the vice president did not preside over an impeachment (of anyone besides the president), the duties would fall to the president pro tempore of the Senate.

To convict an accused, "the concurrence of two thirds of the [senators] present" for at least one article is required. If there is no single charge commanding a "guilty" vote from two-thirds of the senators present, the defendant is acquitted and no punishment is imposed.

=== Removal and disqualification ===
Conviction immediately removes the defendant from office. Following the vote on conviction, the Senate may by a separate vote also bar the individual from holding future federal office, elected or appointed. As the threshold for disqualification is not explicitly mentioned in the Constitution, the Senate has taken the position that disqualification votes only require a simple majority rather than a two-thirds supermajority. The Senate has used disqualification sparingly, as only three individuals have been disqualified from holding future office.

Conviction does not extend to further punishment, for example, loss of pension. After conviction by the Senate, "the Party convicted shall nevertheless be liable and subject to Indictment, Trial, Judgment and Punishment, according to Law" in the regular federal or state courts, just as the convicted party was prior to being disqualified from office by the Senate. However, the Former Presidents Act of 1958, which provides a pension and other benefits, does not extend to presidents who were removed from office following an impeachment conviction. Because of an amendment to that law in 2013, a former president who has been removed from office due to impeachment and conviction is still guaranteed lifetime Secret Service protection.

== History of federal constitutional impeachment ==
In the United Kingdom, impeachment was a procedure whereby a member of the House of Commons could accuse someone of a crime. If the Commons voted for the impeachment, a trial would then be held in the House of Lords. Unlike a bill of attainder, a law declaring a person guilty of a crime, impeachments did not require royal assent, so they could be used to remove troublesome officers of the Crown even if the monarch was trying to protect them.

The monarch, however, was above the law and could not be impeached, or indeed judged guilty of any crime. When King Charles I was tried before the Rump Parliament of the New Model Army in 1649 he denied that they had any right to legally indict him, their king, whose power was given by God and the laws of the country, saying: "no earthly power can justly call me (who is your King) in question as a delinquent ... no learned lawyer will affirm that an impeachment can lie against the King." While the House of Commons pronounced him guilty and ordered his execution anyway, the jurisdictional issue tainted the proceedings.

With this example in mind, the delegates to the 1787 Constitutional Convention chose to include an impeachment procedure in Article II, Section 4 of the Constitution which could be applied to any government official; they explicitly mentioned the president to ensure there would be no ambiguity. Opinions differed, however, as to the reasons Congress should be able to initiate an impeachment. Initial drafts listed only treason and bribery, but George Mason favored impeachment for "maladministration" (incompetence). James Madison argued that impeachment should only be for criminal behavior, arguing that a maladministration standard would effectively mean that the president would serve at the pleasure of the Senate. Thus the delegates adopted a compromise version allowing impeachment by the House for "treason, bribery and other high crimes and misdemeanors" and conviction by the Senate only with the concurrence of two-thirds of the senators present.

== List of federal impeachments ==
The House has approved articles of impeachment 22 times for 21 federal officers. Of these:

- Fifteen were federal judges: thirteen district court judges, one court of appeals judge (who also sat on the Commerce Court), and one associate justice of the Supreme Court.
- Three were sitting presidents: Andrew Johnson, Bill Clinton, and Donald Trump (who was impeached twice as a sitting President – though the second trial was conducted while he was already out of office and presided by the President Pro Tempore of the Senate).
- Two were Cabinet secretaries.
- One was a U.S. Senator.

Of the 22 impeachments by the House:

- Eight defendants were convicted and removed from office
- Three cases did not come to trial because the individuals had resigned and the Senate did not pursue the case
- One ended because the impeached person was a U.S. Senator and the Senate held that he was not a "civil officer of the United States" and could therefore not be impeached
- Ten ended in acquittal.

To date, every convicted official was a federal judge. Of the eight to have been convicted and removed, three were disqualified from ever holding federal office again by the Senate. One of the remaining five is former congressman Alcee Hastings (D-Florida), who was convicted and removed from office as a federal judge in 1989, but was not barred from holding federal office, only to be elected to the United States House of Representatives in 1992, a seat he held until his death on April 6, 2021.

No president impeached by the House has been convicted by the Senate. In two cases, a Senate majority voted to convict an impeached president, but the vote fell short of the required two-thirds majority and therefore the impeached president was not convicted. The two instances where this happened were the Senate trial of Andrew Johnson in 1868 (where Johnson escaped conviction by one vote), and the second Senate trial of Donald Trump in 2021, where Trump missed conviction by 10 votes.

The following table lists federal officials who were impeached.

Blue highlight indicates presidents of the United States.

| # | Date of impeachment | Accused | Office | Accusations | House vote margin | Senate result (Note: "Removed and disqualified" indicates that following conviction the Senate voted to disqualify the individual from holding further federal office pursuant to Article I, Section 3 of the United States Constitution, which provides, in pertinent part, that "[j]udgment in cases of impeachment shall not extend further than to removal from office, and disqualification to hold and enjoy any office of honor, trust or profit under the United States.") |
|---|---|---|---|---|---|---|
| 1 | July 7, 1797 | William Blount | United States Senator (Tennessee) | Conspiring to assist Britain in capturing Spanish territory | 41–30 (Note: After passage of an impeachment resolution by this margin, votes were later held on adoption of articles of impeachment) | Senate expelled him from the chamber on their own authority on July 8, 1797. The House approved articles of impeachment on January 28, 1798. At the end of the trial on January 11, 1799, Senate voted that they did not have jurisdiction. (Note: During the impeachment trial of Senator Blount, it was argued that the House of Representatives did not have the power to impeach members of either House of Congress; though the Senate never explicitly ruled on this argument, the House has never again impeached a member of Congress. The Constitution allows either house to expel one of its members by a two-thirds vote, which the Senate had done to Blount on the same day the House impeached him (but before the Senate heard the case).) |
| 2 | March 2, 1803 | John Pickering | Judge (District of New Hampshire) | Drunkenness and unlawful rulings | 45–8 | Convicted; removed on March 12, 1804 |
| 3 | March 12, 1804 | Samuel Chase | Associate Justice (Supreme Court of the United States) | Political bias and arbitrary rulings, promoting a partisan political agenda on the bench | 73–32 | Acquitted on March 1, 1805 |
| 4 | April 24, 1830 | James H. Peck | Judge (District of Missouri) | Abuse of power | 123–49 | Acquitted on January 31, 1831 |
| 5 | May 6, 1862 | West Hughes Humphreys | Judge (Eastern, Middle, and Western Districts of Tennessee) | Supporting the Confederacy | Unanimous (Note: The vote occurred "without division"; no roll call was taken) | Convicted; removed and disqualified on June 26, 1862 |
| 6 | February 24, 1868 | Andrew Johnson | President of the United States | Violating the Tenure of Office Act. The Supreme Court would later state in dicta that the (by then repealed) Tenure of Office Act had been unconstitutional. | 126–47 (Note: There is a record keeping discrepancy for the February 24, 1868 vote to impeach Andrew Johnson. While the Congressional Globe recorded the vote as being 126–47 (with Republicans William Henry Koontz and Francis Thomas both being recorded as absent), the United States House Journal recorded the vote as being 128–47 (with Koontz and Thomas both being recorded present and voting in support of the resolution). The Office of the House Historian uses the Congressional Globe tally on its website, and, therefore, this article and others on Wikipedia also use that tally.) | Acquitted on May 26, 1868; 35–19 in favor of conviction, falling one vote short of two-thirds. |
| 7 | February 28, 1873 | Mark W. Delahay | Judge (District of Kansas) | Drunkenness | Unanimous | Resigned on December 12, 1873 |
| 8 | March 2, 1876 | William W. Belknap | United States Secretary of War (resigned just before impeachment vote) | Graft, corruption | Unanimous | Resigned on March 2, 1876; acquitted on August 1, 1876 |
| 9 | December 13, 1904 | Charles Swayne | Judge (Northern District of Florida) | Failure to live in his district, abuse of power | 162–138 | Acquitted on February 27, 1905 |
| 10 | July 11, 1912 | Robert W. Archbald | Associate Justice (United States Commerce Court); Judge (Third Circuit Court of Appeals) | Improper acceptance of gifts from litigants and attorneys | 223–1 | Convicted; removed and disqualified on January 13, 1913 |
| 11 | April 1, 1926 | George W. English | Judge (Eastern District of Illinois) | Abuse of power | 306–62 | Resigned on November 4, 1926, proceedings dismissed on December 13, 1926 |
| 12 | February 24, 1933 | Harold Louderback | Judge (Northern District of California) | Corruption | 183–142 | Acquitted on May 24, 1933 |
| 13 | March 2, 1936 | Halsted L. Ritter | Judge (Southern District of Florida) | Champerty, corruption, tax evasion, practicing law while a judge | 181–146 | Convicted; removed on April 17, 1936 |
| 14 | July 22, 1986 | Harry E. Claiborne | Judge (District of Nevada) | Tax evasion | 406–0 | Convicted; removed on October 9, 1986 |
| 15 | August 3, 1988 | Alcee Hastings | Judge (Southern District of Florida) | Accepting a bribe, and committing perjury during the resulting investigation | 413–3 | Convicted; removed on October 20, 1989 |
| 16 | May 10, 1989 | Walter Nixon | Chief Judge (Southern District of Mississippi) | Perjury | 417–0 | Convicted; removed on November 3, 1989 (Note: Judge Nixon later challenged the validity of his removal from office on procedural grounds; the challenge was ultimately rejected as nonjusticiable by the Supreme Court in Nixon v. United States.) |
| 17 | December 19, 1998 | Bill Clinton | President of the United States | Perjury and obstruction of justice | 228–207 (Art. I); 221–212 (Art. II) (Note: Two other proposed articles of impeachment were defeated, with one failing 205–229 and the other failing 148–285) | Acquitted on February 12, 1999: 45–55 on perjury and 50–50 on obstruction of justice |
| 18 | June 19, 2009 | Samuel B. Kent | Judge (Southern District of Texas) | Sexual assault, and obstruction of justice during the resulting investigation | 389–0 (Art. I); 385–0 (Art. II); 381–0 (Art. III); 372–0, 1 present (Art. IV) | Resigned on June 30, 2009, proceedings dismissed on July 22, 2009 |
| 19 | March 11, 2010 | Thomas Porteous | Judge (Eastern District of Louisiana) | Making false financial disclosures, corruption. | 412–0 (Art. I); 410–0 (Art. II); 416–0 (Art. III); 423–0 (Art. IV) | Convicted; removed and disqualified on December 8, 2010 |
| 20 | December 18, 2019 | Donald Trump | President of the United States | Abuse of power and obstruction of Congress | 230–197, 1 present (Art. I); 229–198, 1 present (Art. II) | Acquitted on February 5, 2020: 48–52 on abuse of power and 47–53 on obstruction of Congress |
| 21 | January 13, 2021 | Donald Trump | President of the United States | Incitement of insurrection | 232–197 | Acquitted on February 13, 2021: 57–43 in favor of conviction on incitement of insurrection, falling 10 votes short of two-thirds. |
| 22 | February 13, 2024 | Alejandro Mayorkas | United States Secretary of Homeland Security | Failure to comply with Federal immigration laws and breach of public trust | 214–213 (Note: Vote to impeach came after a failed 214–216 vote days earlier) | Senate dismissed both articles of impeachment, ruling them unconstitutional and out of order, 51–48 in favor of dismissing of the article on failing to comply with Federal immigration law, and 51–49 in favor of dismissing the article on breach of public trust. |

=== Examples of other impeachment investigations ===
The House of Representatives has initiated impeachment proceedings many times.

Two impeachment processes against John Tyler and Richard Nixon were commenced, but not completed, as the impeachment attempt against Tyler failed in 1843 and Nixon resigned from office before the full House voted on the articles of impeachment in 1974. To date, no president or vice president has been removed from office by impeachment and conviction.

Below is an incomplete list of some of the notable impeachment investigations that did not lead to formal charges passing the House. Blue highlight indicates President of the United States.

| Year of investigation | Accused | Office | Accusations | Summary |
|---|---|---|---|---|
| 1826 | John C. Calhoun | Vice president of the United States | Profiting from a contract during tenure as United States secretary of war | Calhoun requested the impeachment investigation himself, in hopes of clearing his name from allegations he profited from a contract during his tenure as United States secretary of war. Investigation lasted only weeks, and found Calhoun innocent of wrongdoing |
| 1842 | John Tyler | President of the United States | Abuse of veto power | On July 10, 1842, Congress formed a committee led by former president John Quincy Adams to initiate the first investigation against Tyler. After several months of investigation, the impeachment attempt against Tyler failed at 83–127. |
| 1860 | James Buchanan | President of the United States | Corruption | The Covode committee was established March 5, 1860, and submitted its final report on June 16, 1860. The committee found that Buchanan had not done anything to warrant impeachment, but that his was the most corrupt administration since the adoption of the US Constitution in 1787. |
| 1867 | Andrew Johnson | President of the United States | High crimes and misdemeanors | On January 7, 1867, the House of Representatives voted to launch an impeachment inquiry into Johnson run by the House Committee on the Judiciary. On November 25, 1867, the committee, voted 5–4 to recommend impeachment proceedings. On December 7, 1867, the full House rejected impeachment by a 108–56 vote. Johnson would later, separately, be impeached in 1868. |
| 1953 | William O. Douglas | Associate Justice of the U.S. Supreme Court | Brief stay of execution for Julius and Ethel Rosenberg | Referred to Judiciary Committee (Jun. 18, 1953); committee voted to end the investigation (Jul 7, 1953). |
| 1970 | William O. Douglas | Associate Justice of the U.S. Supreme Court | Failure to recuse on obscenity cases while at the same time having articles published in Evergreen Review and Avant-Garde magazines; conflict of paid board positions with two non-profits | Referred to a special subcommittee of the House Judiciary Committee (Apr. 21, 1970); subcommittee voted to end the investigation (Dec. 3, 1970). |
| 1973–1974 | Richard Nixon | President of the United States | Obstruction of justice, abuse of power, contempt of Congress | House Judiciary Committee begins investigating and issuing subpoenas (Oct. 30, 1973); House Judiciary Report on committee investigation (Feb. 1, 1974); House resolution 93-803 authorizes Judiciary Committee investigation (Feb. 6, 1974); House Judiciary Committee votes three articles of impeachment to House floor (July 27–30, 1974); proceedings terminated by resignation of President Nixon (August 8, 1974). |
| 2023 | Joe Biden | President of the United States | Corruption | Inquiry launched September 12, 2023 |

There have been several unsuccessful attempts to initiate impeachment proceedings against presidents including George W. Bush and Barack Obama.

== See also ==
=== Related articles ===
- Censure in the United States
- Federal impeachment trial in the United States
- Impeachment in the United States
- Jefferson's Manual
- List of federal political scandals in the United States

==== Investigations ====
- Impeachment inquiry in the United States
- List of impeachment investigations of United States federal officials
- List of impeachment investigations of United States federal judges
- List of unsuccessful efforts to impeach United States federal officials
- 1868 impeachment managers investigation
- First impeachment inquiry against Andrew Johnson
- Second impeachment inquiry against Andrew Johnson
- Impeachment inquiry against Bill Clinton
- Impeachment inquiry against Donald Trump
- Impeachment inquiry against Joe Biden
- United States House Select Committee to Investigate Alleged Corruptions in Government
- United States House Judiciary Task Force on Judicial Impeachment – investigated impeachment of Thomas Porteous and Samuel Kent

==== Efforts (presidential) ====
- List of efforts to impeach presidents of the United States
- Presidency of John Tyler § Impeachment proceedings
- United States House Select Committee to Investigate Alleged Corruptions in Government – impeachment investigation against James Buchanan
- Impeachment process against Richard Nixon
- Efforts to impeach George W. Bush
- Efforts to impeach Barack Obama
- Efforts to impeach Donald Trump (includes various unsuccessful attempts)
- List of impeachment resolutions introduced against Donald Trump
- Efforts to impeach Joe Biden

==== Efforts (vice presidential) ====
- List of efforts to impeach vice presidents of the United States
- Efforts to impeach Dick Cheney

==== Formal impeachments (presidential) ====
- Impeachment of Andrew Johnson
- Impeachment of Bill Clinton
- First impeachment of Donald Trump
- Second impeachment of Donald Trump
