= House of Commons of England =

Lower house of the Parliament of England (1341-1707)

Coordinates: 51°29′59.6″N 0°07′28.8″W

The Honourable the Commons of the Kingdom of England in Parliament assembled
- Royal coat of arms of England (1509–1554) with English lion and Welsh dragon

Type
- Type: Lower house

History
- Established: 1341
- Disbanded: 1 May 1707
- Preceded by: Parliament of England
- Succeeded by: House of Commons of Great Britain

Elections
- Voting system: First past the post with limited suffrage

Meeting place
- Various, but usually at the Palace of Westminster

Footnotes
- See also: House of Commons of Great Britain; House of Commons of Ireland

The House of Commons of England was the lower house of the Parliament of England (which incorporated Wales) from its development in the 14th century to the union of England and Scotland in 1707, when it was replaced by the House of Commons of Great Britain after the 1707 Act of Union was passed in both the English and Scottish parliaments at the time. In 1801, with the union of Great Britain and Ireland, that house was in turn replaced by the House of Commons of the United Kingdom.

== Origins ==
The Parliament of England developed from the Magnum Concilium that advised the English monarch in medieval times. This royal council, meeting for short periods, included ecclesiastics, noblemen, and representatives of the counties (known as "knights of the shire"). The chief duty of the council was to approve taxes proposed by the Crown. In many cases, however, the council demanded the redress of the people's grievances before proceeding to vote on taxation. Thus, it developed legislative powers.

The first Parliament to invite representatives of the major towns was summoned by the rebel leader Simon de Montfort in 1265 during the Second Barons' War, with a strategy to secure his position following his victory at the Battle of Lewes. Proving popular, the practice was adopted by Edward I when he called the Model Parliament of 1295, to which representatives of the boroughs (including towns and cities) were summoned. Thus, it became settled practice that each county send two knights of the shire, and that each borough send two burgesses. At first the burgesses were almost entirely powerless, and while the right to representation of each English county quickly became indisputable, the monarch could enfranchise or disfranchise boroughs at pleasure. Any show of independence by burgesses would thus be likely to lead to the exclusion of their towns from Parliament. The knights of the shire were in a better position, although less powerful than their noble and clerical counterparts in what was still a unicameral Parliament.

== Development of independence ==
The division of the Parliament of England into two houses occurred during the reign of Edward III: in 1341 the Commons met separately from the nobility and clergy for the first time, creating in effect an Upper Chamber and a Lower Chamber, with the knights and burgesses sitting in the latter. They formed what became known as the House of Commons, while the clergy and nobility became the House of Lords. Although they remained subordinate to both the Crown and the Lords, the Commons did act with increasing boldness. During the Good Parliament of 1376, the Commons appointed Peter de la Mare to convey to the Lords their complaints of heavy taxes, demands for an accounting of the royal expenditures, and criticism of the King's management of the military. The Commons even proceeded to impeach some of the King's ministers. Although Mare was imprisoned for his actions, the benefits of having a single voice to represent the Commons were recognized, and the office which became known as Speaker of the House of Commons was thus created. Mare was soon released after the death of King Edward III and in 1377 became the second speaker of the Commons.

During the reign of the next monarch, Richard II, the Commons once again began to impeach errant ministers of the Crown. They began to insist that they could control both taxation and public expenditures. Despite such gains in authority, however, the Commons still remained much less powerful than the Lords and the Crown.

The influence of the Crown was increased by the civil wars of the late fifteenth century, which significantly diminished the power of the great noblemen. Both houses of Parliament held little power during the ensuing years, and the absolute supremacy of the Sovereign was restored. The domination of the monarch grew further under the House of Tudor in the early sixteenth century as Henry VII grew fiscally independent. The Reformation Parliament, called by Henry VIII after Cardinal Wolsey failed to secure a divorce from Catherine of Aragon and sitting from 1529 to 1536 made laws affecting all aspects of national life, but especially with regard to religious matters previously reserved to the church. Though acting at the behest and under the direction of the King and his leading minister, Thomas Cromwell, Parliament was acquiring universal legal competence and responsibility for all matters affecting the realm.

When the House of Stuart came to the English throne in 1603, the dependence of the Crown on Parliament for sufficient revenue to fund the operations of government returned as an issue and point of leverage. The first two Stuart monarchs, James I and Charles I, provoked conflicts with the Commons over issues such as taxation, religion, and royal powers.

The House of Commons, 1640

The differences between Charles I and Parliament were great, and resulted in the English Civil War, in which the armed forces of Parliament were victorious. In December 1648 the House of Commons was purged by the New Model Army, which was supposed to be subservient to Parliament. Pride's Purge was the only military coup in English history. Subsequently, Charles I was beheaded and the Upper House was abolished. The unicameral Parliament that remained was later referred to by critics as the Rump Parliament, as it consisted only of a small selection of Members of Parliament approved by the army – some of whom were soldiers themselves. In 1653, when leading figures in this Parliament began to disagree with the army, it was dissolved by Oliver Cromwell. However, the monarchy and the House of Lords were both restored with the Commons in 1660. The influence of the Crown had been decreased, and was further diminished after James II was deposed in the Glorious Revolution of 1688 and the Bill of Rights 1689 was enacted.

== Representation outside British Isles ==
Two European cities, both annexed from and later ceded to the Kingdom of France were represented in the Parliament as borough constituencies while they were English possessions:

- Calais, between 1372 and 1558
- Tournai between 1513 and 1519 (now in Belgium)

== See also ==
- Duration of English parliaments before 1660
- Borough status in the United Kingdom
  - Ancient borough
- Lex Parliamentaria, a pocket manual for Members of Parliament, first published in 1690
- List of acts of the Parliament of England
- List of parliaments of England
- List of speakers of the House of Commons of England
- Modus Tenendi Parliamentum, a 14th-century document that outlined an idealised version of English parliamentary procedure
