= Lex Parliamentaria =

Parliamentary procedure manual

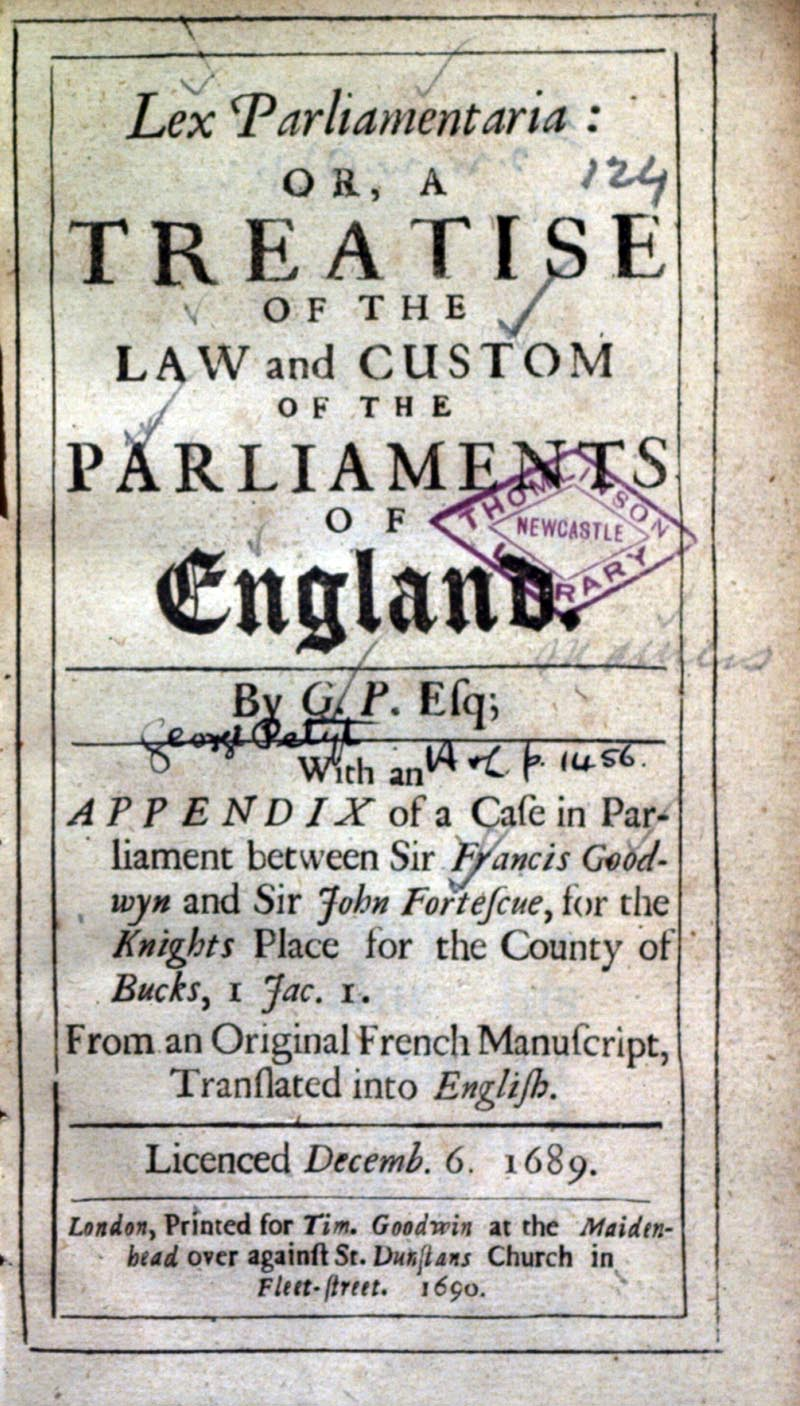
The title page of the first edition of Lex Parliamentaria (1690)

Lex Parliamentaria; or, A treatise of the law and custom of the Parliaments of England, was a pocket manual for members of the Parliament of England first published in 1690.

== History ==
It was originally attributed to George Petyt. However, an attribution to Irishman George Philips seems now to be widely accepted, including by the historians Sir James Ware and Walter Harris. Thomas Jefferson praised the book in a letter to his son-in-law, opining, "For parliamentary knowledge the Lex parliamentaria is the best book." Its American counterparts are Jefferson's own 1801 Manual of Parliamentary Practice and Lex Parliamentaria Americana by Luther Stearns Cushing. The term lex parliamentaria is also sometimes used to describe parliamentary law in general.

== See also ==
- House of Commons of England
- House of Lords
