= Michael Smith (newspaper reporter) =

British author and former correspondent

Michael Smith (born 1952) is a British author who specializes in spies and espionage. He is also a former member of the board of the Bletchley Park Trust.

Smith is a former soldier ("military intelligence officer") and journalist best known for obtaining and publishing the documents collectively known as The Downing Street Memos. The Downing Street memo itself was an official record of a meeting of the British war cabinet held in July 2002. It revealed the disclosure by Sir Richard Dearlove, then the head of the British Secret Intelligence Service (MI6), that the intelligence to justify an invasion was being "fixed around the policy". The Downing Street memo was in fact just one of eight documents obtained by Smith which showed that President George W. Bush and Prime Minister Tony Blair agreed in April 2002 to invade Iraq; that they planned to "wrongfoot" Saddam Hussein to give them the excuse to do so; and that they used flights over the southern no-fly zone of Iraq to begin the air war against Iraq in May 2002, with "spikes of activity" which they hoped might provoke Iraq into reacting and giving them the excuse to go to war.

Smith won a British Press Award in 2006 for Specialist Writer of the Year. The award was for his work in revealing the Downing Street memo.

Smith obtained the first six of the eight Downing Street Memos while working for the Daily Telegraph. The second set of two documents, including the Downing Street memo itself, were obtained while he was working for the Sunday Times. He has also worked for the BBC and contributed to The Raw Story and New Statesman.

He is the author of a number of books, including the UK Number 1 bestseller Station X: The Codebreakers of Bletchley Park (1998). This was subsequently televised and updated in 2011 as The Secrets of Station X: How the Bletchley Park Codebreakers Helped Win the War. Other books by Smith include Killer Elite: The Inside Story of America's Most Secret Special Operations Team (2006), which was updated in May 2011 to include the first accurate account of the killing of Osama bin Laden.

Smith's book Foley: The Spy Who Saved 10,000 Jews (1999) led to Frank Foley, the MI6 head of station in Berlin during the 1930s being made Righteous Among the Nations, the highest award the Jewish state can award to a gentile. According to Jewish aid workers, Foley saved "tens of thousands" of Jews from the Holocaust, giving them visas and passports to which they were not entitled, going into the concentration camps to get Jews out, and in the period after Kristallnacht in November 1938, hiding five or six Jews in his home every night. Foley: The Spy Who Saved 10,000 Jews was republished by Biteback as a Dialogue Espionage Classic in 2016.

Before becoming a journalist, Smith was a member of the British Army, serving for nine years in the Intelligence Corps. After leaving the Army, he worked as a journalist, initially for BBC Monitoring. He then joined the Daily Telegraph where he worked as an assistant foreign editor, then a news reporter and finally Defence Correspondent. In 2005, he joined the Sunday Times where he specialised in defence and intelligence issues. Smith left the Sunday Times in 2012 to become a full-time author.

Smith has written 16 works of non-fiction. His first novel Ritter: No Man Dies Twice, a detective/spy thriller set in Nazi Germany during the Second World War was published in February 2022.

== Books by Michael Smith ==
- Elphick, Peter and Smith, Michael : Odd Man Out: The Story of the Singapore Traitor (1993, Hodder and Stoughton) ISBN 978-0340587621
- Smith, Michael : New Cloak, Old Dagger: How Britain’s Spies Came in from the Cold (1996, Gollancz) ISBN 978-0575061507
- Smith, Michael : Station X (1998, Boxtree) ISBN 978-0752221892
- Smith, Michael : Foley: The Spy Who Saved 10,000 Jews (1999, Hodder and Stoughton) ISBN 978-0340718506
- Smith, Michael : The Spying Game (2003, Politicos) ISBN 978-1842750049
- Smith, Michael : Killer Elite: The Inside Story of America’s Most Secret Special Operations Team (2007, St Martin's Press) ISBN 978-0312362720
- Smith, Michael : Six: A History of Britain’s Secret Intelligence Service (2010, Biteback) ISBN 978-1906447120
- Smith, Michael : The Emperor's Codes (2010, Biteback) ISBN 978-1906447120
- Erskine, Ralph and Smith, Michael (editors): The Bletchley Park Codebreakers (2011, Biteback) ISBN 978-1849540780
- Smith, Michael : Britain’s Secret War (2011, Andre Deutsch) ISBN 978-0233003375
- Smith, Michael : The Secrets of Station X (2011, Biteback) ISBN 978-1849540957
- Smith, Michael : Bletchley Park: The Codebreakers of Station X (2013, Shire) ISBN 978-0747812159
- Smith, Michael (editor): The Secret Agent’s Bedside Reader (2014, Biteback) ISBN 978-1849547406
- Smith, Michael : The Debs of Bletchley Park and Other Stories (2015, Aurum) ISBN 978-1781313879
- Smith, Michael : The Anatomy of a Spy (2020, Arcade) ISBN 978-1950691166
- Smith, Michael : Ritter: No Man Dies Twice (2022, Safe House) ISBN 978-1739754006
- Smith, Michael : The Real Special Relationship (2023, Arcade) ISBN 978-1956763683
