= Hearing (law) =

Court proceeding

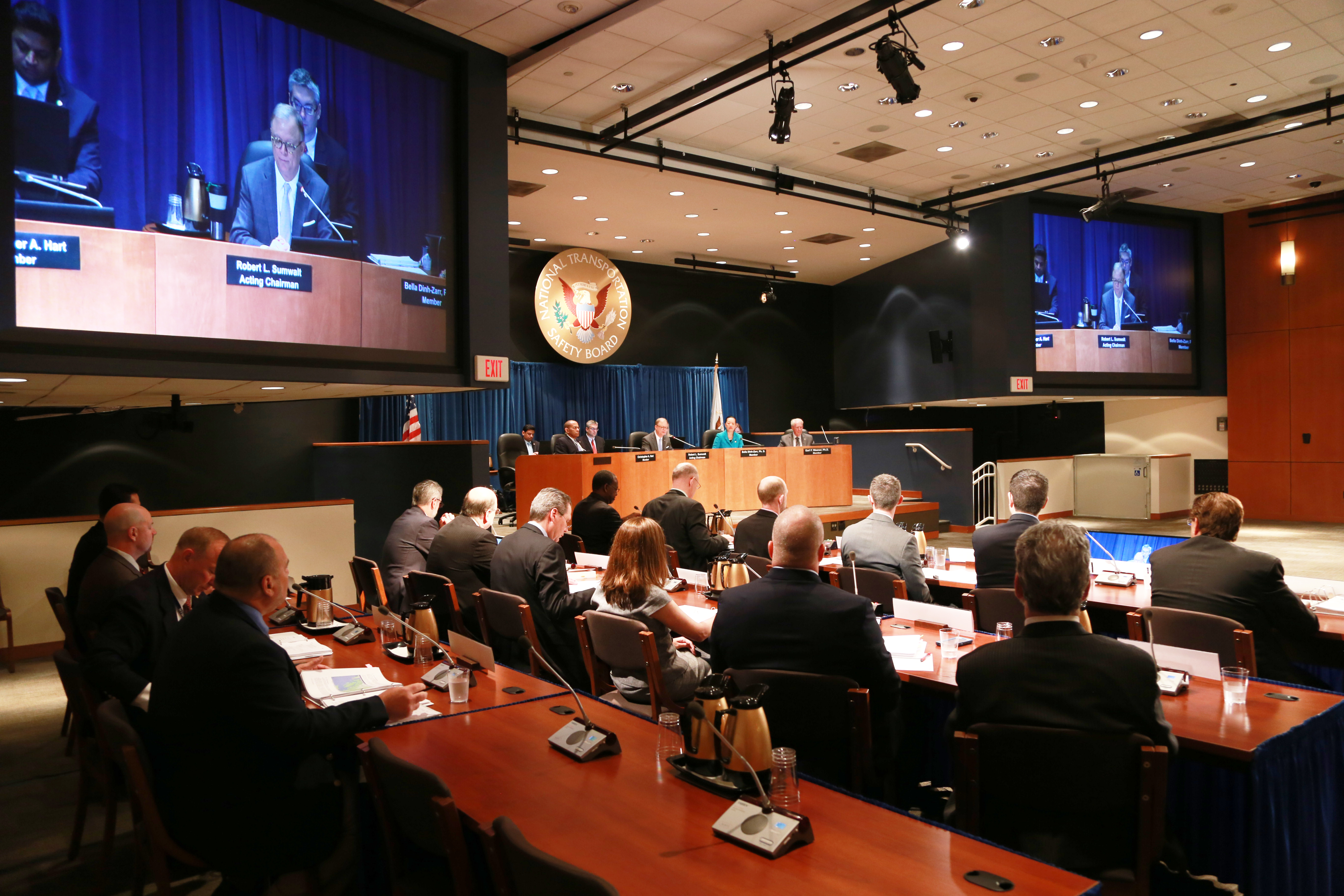
United States' National Transportation Safety Board hearing in 2017, covering the causes to a deHavilland Otter crash in 2015.

In law, a hearing is the formal examination of a case (civil or criminal) before a judge. It is a proceeding before a court or other decision-making body or officer, such as a government agency or a legislative committee.

== Description ==
A hearing is generally distinguished from a trial in that it is usually shorter and often less formal.

During the course of litigation, oral arguments are presented in support of motions at hearings. The purpose of these arguments may be to resolve the case without further trial, such as through a motion to dismiss or for summary judgment, or to decide discrete issues of law, such as the admissibility of evidence, which will determine how the trial proceeds. Limited evidence and testimony may also be presented at hearings to supplement the legal arguments.

== Types ==
Terminology varies from country to country, and there are different types of hearings under different legal systems.

A preliminary hearing (also known as evidentiary hearing, probable cause hearing, and other variant terms) is a proceeding, after a criminal complaint has been filed by the prosecutor, to determine whether there is enough evidence to require a trial.

=== Australia ===
A hearing is a part of the court process in Australia. There are different types of hearing in a case. There may be several hearings, although not all may be scheduled. These include:

- court mentions, where a case first is heard in court; and/or
- directions hearing(s) (a brief hearing in front of a judge or commissioner); and
- a contest mention, where disputed issues are resolved, this is the part of the hearing where evidence may be adduced (the process of putting forward or presenting evidence or arguments for consideration by the court); a "type of pre-trial hearing which aims to facilitate early guilty pleas and narrow the issues in dispute".

=== United Kingdom ===
A hearing is a part of the court process in England and Wales. The term "rolled-up hearing" is also used, referring to occasions when permission is considered for a procedural application on the basis that, if permission is granted, the substantive application will be heard immediately afterwards.

=== United States ===
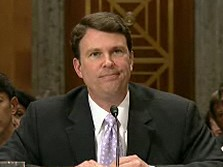
Picture from the John Berry confirmation hearing by the U.S. Senate Committee on Homeland Security and Governmental Affairs in the Dirksen Senate Office Building, Rm. 342.

There are several different types of hearings in the US legal system, each serving a unique purpose. These include:

- Congressional hearing
- Unofficial hearing
- Preliminary hearings are used to determine whether there is sufficient evidence to require a trial. In a preliminary hearing, a judge listens to arguments and evidence from both sides before deciding whether the case should proceed to trial.
- Motion hearings are held when a party asks the court to take a specific action in the case. For example, a party may request that certain evidence be excluded from trial or that a case be dismissed before trial. In a motion hearing, each side presents arguments and evidence to the judge, who then makes a decision based on the law and facts presented.
- Evidentiary hearings are used to resolve disputes related to evidence in a case. During an evidentiary hearing, parties present arguments and evidence related to the admissibility of certain evidence or the validity of expert testimony. The judge then makes a ruling on whether the evidence in question can be presented at trial.
- Depositions are another type of hearing commonly used in the US legal system. Depositions involve sworn testimony from a witness or party in a case, taken outside of court and recorded by a court reporter. Depositions are often used to gather information before trial or to impeach the credibility of a witness at trial.

In the mid-20th century, as a result of what has been called the "due process revolution," a series of Supreme Court decisions expanded the rights of individuals in legal proceedings and required more formal procedures and protections.

One key decision during this period was Goldberg v. Kelly (1970), which involved a challenge to the system for terminating welfare benefits in New York. The Court held that the Due Process Clause of the Fourteenth Amendment requires that individuals have the opportunity to be heard and present evidence before their benefits are terminated.

The decision in Goldberg helped to establish the principle that many administrative decisions require some form of hearing or other procedure to ensure that individuals are not deprived of their rights without due process of law. It also illustrated that what constitutes a hearing can depend on the context. In Goldberg, the goal of a speedy decision was held to "justify the limitation of the pre-termination hearing to minimum procedural safeguards", which included such basic matters as the right to appear and to cross-examine witnesses, but did not include "a complete record and a comprehensive opinion". This has had a significant impact on the US legal system, leading to an increase in the number of hearings and other procedures required in a wide range of legal contexts.

== See also ==
- Continuance
- Due process
- Jury trial
- Lawsuit (another type of legal proceeding)
- Natural justice
- Right to a fair trial
- Rule of law
- Trial by ordeal
