= Efforts to impeach Dick Cheney =

2007 effort to impeach the US Vice President

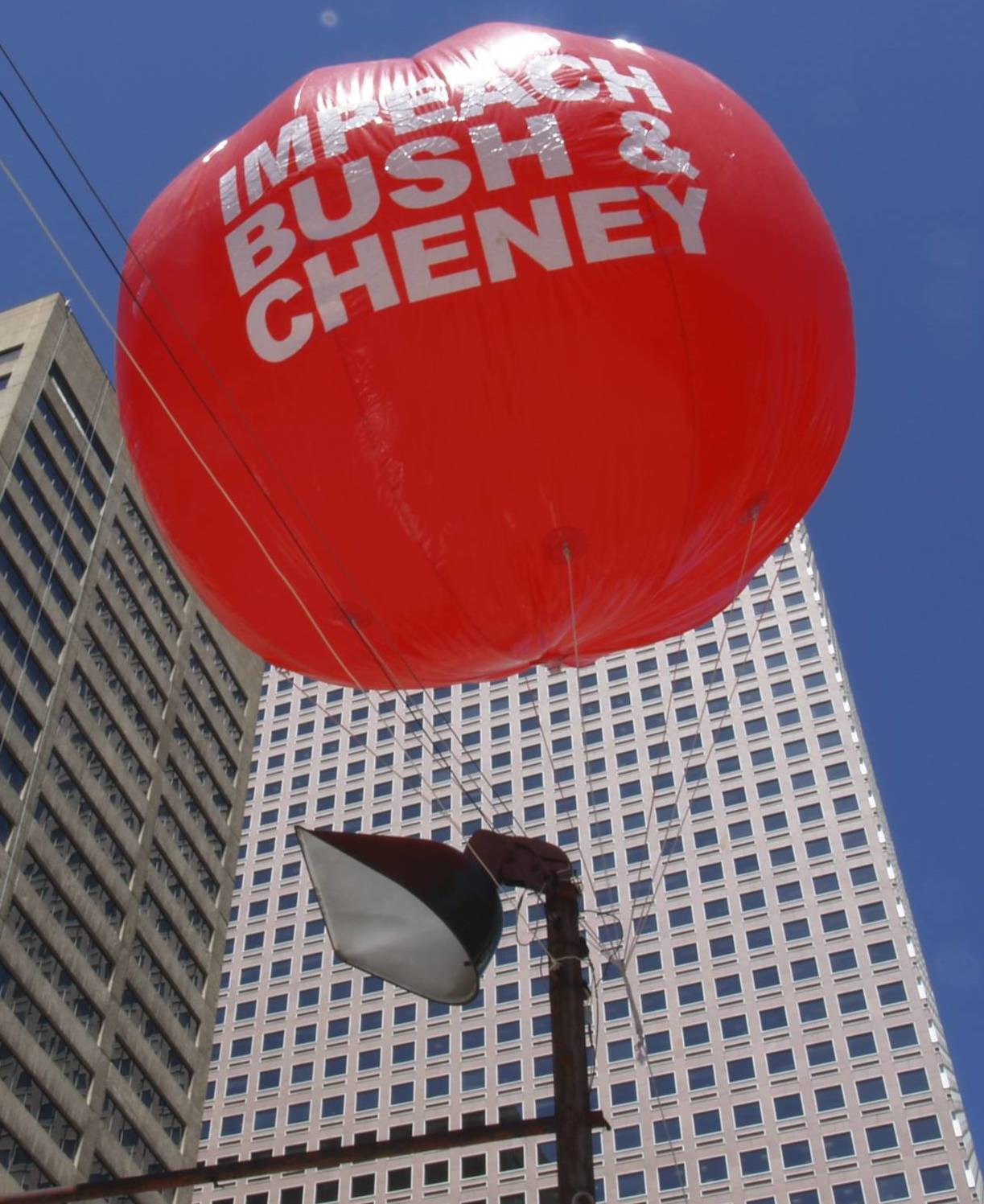
Balloon advocating for the impeachment of Cheney and President George W. Bush in 2008

In April 2007, United States Representative Dennis Kucinich (D-Ohio) filed an impeachment resolution (H.Res. 333) against Vice President Dick Cheney, seeking his trial in the Senate on three charges. After months of inaction, Kucinich re-introduced the exact content of H. Res 333 as a new resolution numbered H.Res. 799 in November 2007. Both resolutions were referred to the Judiciary Committee immediately after their introduction and the Committee did not consider either. Both resolutions expired upon the termination of the 110th United States Congress on January 3, 2009.

== Process ==
The resolution charged that Vice President Cheney:

1. had purposely manipulated the intelligence process to deceive the citizens and Congress of the United States by fabricating a threat of Iraqi weapons of mass destruction
2. had fabricated a threat about an alleged relationship between Iraq and al Qaeda, in order to justify the use of the U.S. Armed Forces against Iraq in a manner damaging to U.S. national security interests
3. in violation of his constitutional oath and duty, openly threatened aggression against Iran absent any real threat to the United States, and had done so with the proven U.S. capability to carry out such threats, thus undermining U.S. national security.

The resolution was authored and submitted by Congressman Dennis Kucinich, a representative of Ohio who was also a presidential candidate in the 2008 election. Congressman Kucinich has made available more than 45 documents supporting the articles of impeachment at his Congressional website, including at least 15 for each article.

Congressman Dennis Kucinich introduced the resolution on April 24, 2007. During his press conference announcing the resolution, Kucinich stated that he had not informed his party's leadership of the resolution and had not recently spoken about the resolution with Speaker of the House Nancy Pelosi or Congressman John Conyers, the Chairman of the committee to which his resolution was referred.

Upon introduction, Resolution 333 was referred to the House Judiciary Committee, chaired by Congressman John Conyers. Kucinich's resolution slowly gathered additional co-sponsors, but the Judiciary Committee never addressed the resolution at a hearing. On November 6, 2007, Kucinich read the text of HRES 333 on the House floor as a new resolution (H Res 799), offering it as a "Question of the Privileges of the House". Democratic leadership, led by House Majority Leader Steny Hoyer, immediately moved to table the resolution. In what was expected to be an overwhelming vote in favor of tabling, Republicans began voting against doing so, trying to force a debate "potentially embarrassing" to Democrats. The resolution was kept alive after a vote of 251-162 against tabling, with 165 Republicans voting against terminating it. To avoid a debate, Hoyer then made a motion to refer H Res 799 to the Judiciary Committee for its review, although this referral would not require Committee action on the resolution. This motion was successful and the resolution was referred to the Judiciary Committee after a vote of 218-194. House speaker Nancy Pelosi has said "impeachment is off the table", and the Democrats have no interest in impeaching Mr. Cheney or President Bush over the Iraq war.

Both resolutions were referred to the Subcommittee on the Constitution, Civil Rights, and Civil Liberties, chaired by Congressman Jerrold Nadler in addition to the Judiciary Committee. Neither committee ever held a hearing to consider either resolution. Both resolutions expired at the end of the 110th Congress on January 3, 2009.

== Co-sponsors ==
In addition to Rep. Kucinich, the prime sponsor of the resolution, there were twenty-six co-sponsors:

Name of Representative	State - District	Party	Date signed	Notes
Tammy Baldwin	Wisconsin - 2	Democratic	January 8, 2007	member of House Judiciary Committee
Leonard Boswell	Iowa - 3	Democratic	February 14, 2008	
Robert Brady	Pennsylvania - 1	Democratic	July 24, 2007	
Yvette Clarke	New York - 11	Democratic	June 6, 2007	
William Lacy Clay, Jr.	Missouri - 1	Democratic	January 5, 2007	
Steve Cohen	Tennessee - 9	Democratic	April 8, 2007	member of House Judiciary Committee member of the Subcommittee on the Constitution, Civil Rights, and Civil Liberties
Danny K. Davis	Illinois - 7	Democratic	May 11, 2007	
Keith Ellison	Minnesota - 5	Minnesota Democratic-Farmer-Labor Party	June 28, 2007	member of House Judiciary Committee member of the Subcommittee on the Constitution, Civil Rights, and Civil Liberties
Sam Farr	California - 17	Democratic	December 7, 2007	
Bob Filner	California - 51	Democratic	December 7, 2007	
Raul Grijalva	Arizona - 7	Democratic	May 12, 2007	
Sheila Jackson-Lee	Texas - 18	Democratic	April 8, 2007	member of House Judiciary Committee
Hank Johnson	Georgia - 4	Democratic	June 28, 2007	member of House Judiciary Committee
Carolyn Kilpatrick	Michigan - 13	Democratic	July 9, 2007	
Barbara Lee	California - 9	Democratic	July 6, 2007	
Jim McDermott	Washington - 7	Democratic	October 7, 2007	
James Moran	Virginia - 8	Democratic	October 7, 2007	
Gwen Moore	Wisconsin - 4	Democratic	December 19, 2007	
Donald M. Payne	New Jersey - 10	Democratic	January 8, 2007	
Jan Schakowsky	Illinois - 9	Democratic	January 5, 2007	
Pete Stark	California - 13	Democratic	May 3, 2008	
Edolphus Towns	New York - 10	Democratic	September 27, 2007	
Maxine Waters	California - 35	Democratic	December 6, 2007	member of House Judiciary Committee
Diane Watson	California - 33	Democratic	October 16, 2007	
Robert Wexler	Florida - 19	Democratic	November 6, 2008	member of House Judiciary Committee
Lynn Woolsey	California - 6	Democratic	July 6, 2007	
Albert Wynn	Maryland - 4	Democratic	October 5, 2007	

== See also ==
- Impeachment
- Federal impeachment in the United States
- Efforts to impeach George W. Bush
- List of efforts to impeach vice presidents of the United States
