= Unofficial hearing =

Type of hearing of the U.S. Congress

Unofficial hearing in the context of U.S. Congress is a hearing conducted by either single congressional representatives of the United States or other state or local legislative bodies in order to hear the testimony of the people. It is unofficial because they are not conducted by either Congressional Committees of the United States Congress, or by state or local executive or legislative bodies. They have no power to issue subpoenas or enforce them. Attendance to such a hearing is entirely voluntary. Usually, they are conducted by members of the minority party.

== See also ==
- Hearing (law)
