= Jefferson's Manual =

Book by Thomas Jefferson

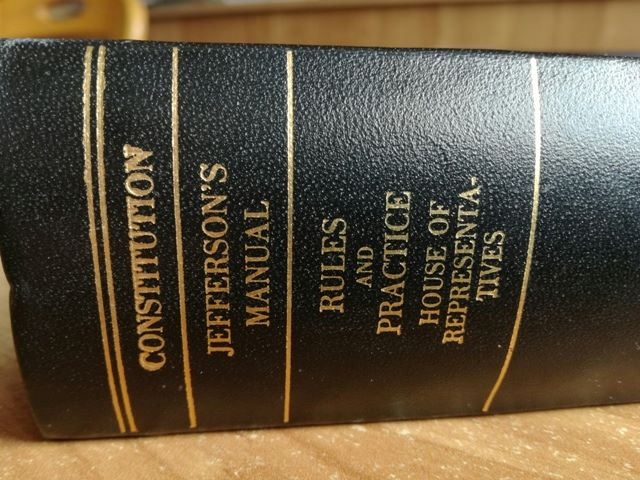
Book cover of the US constitution with the Jefferson's Manual

A Manual of Parliamentary Practice for the Use of the Senate of the United States, written by Thomas Jefferson in 1801, is the first American book on parliamentary procedure. As Vice President of the United States, Jefferson served as the Senate's presiding officer from 1797 to 1801. Throughout these four years, Jefferson worked on various texts and, in early 1800, started to assemble them into a single manuscript for the Senate's use. In December 1800 he delivered his manuscript to printer Samuel Harrison Smith, who delivered the final product to Jefferson on February 27, 1801. Later, the House of Representatives also adopted the Manual for use in its chamber.

Jefferson's Manual was based on notes Jefferson took while studying parliamentary procedure at the College of William and Mary. A second edition with added material by Jefferson was printed in 1812.

The Manual is arranged in fifty-three categories from (1) The Importance of Adhering to Rules to (53) Impeachment. Each section includes the appropriate rules and practices of the British Parliament along with the applicable texts from the Constitution of the United States and the thirty-two Senate rules that existed in 1801.

== U.S. Senate ==
The Senate traditionally has not considered Jefferson's Manual of Parliamentary Practice to be its direct authority on parliamentary procedure. However, starting in 1828 the Senate began publishing a version of Jefferson's Manual for its use, removing the Senate Rules from within the text and placing them in a separate section. In 1888, when the Senate initiated publication of the Senate Manual, a copy of the manual was included in each biennial edition. This practice continued until 1977.

== U.S. House of Representatives ==
The House of Representatives formally incorporated Jefferson's Manual into its rules in 1837, stipulating that the manual "should govern the House in all cases to which they are applicable and in which they are not inconsistent with the standing rules and order of the House and the joint rules of the Senate and the House of Representatives." Since then, the House has regularly printed an abridged version of the Manual in its publication entitled Constitution, Jefferson's Manual, and Rules of the House of Representatives.

== See also ==
- Lex Parliamentaria
- Erskine May: Parliamentary Practice
