= Roosevelt Hall (Skaneateles, New York) =

Coordinates: 42°56′18.6″N 76°25′53.7″W

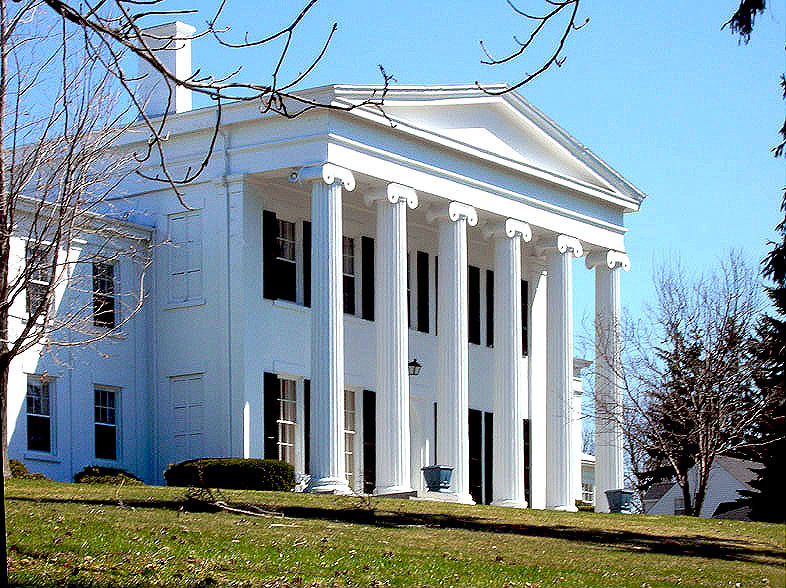
- December 2006

General information
- Architectural style: Greek Revival
- Location: Skaneateles, New York
- Address: West Lake Road
- Completed: 1839
- Owner: Samuel M. Roosevelt; Mary and Peter Drescher

Design and construction
- Architect(s): Ithiel Town

Roosevelt Hall (also known as the Richard DeZeng House or Lakota) is a historic home in Skaneateles, New York.

== History ==
In 1838, Richard Lawrence DeZeng (1788–1848), a retired engineer and canal builder from Oswego, New York, bought the 220-acre property in Skaneateles for $12,000. In the same year, Nicholas Roosevelt and his wife, Lydia Latrobe Roosevelt (daughter of architect Benjamin Henry Latrobe), also retired to Skaneateles. The first foundation stone was laid in May 1839. DeZeng hired George Casey of Auburn, New York to construct the 25-room Greek Revival mansion at a cost of $18,000 (with an additional $11,000 spent on interior furnishings). The DeZengs call the home, Lake Home.

The home may be the work of Ithiel Town, the partner of Alexander Jackson Davis, who designed the nearby 1852 home of Reuel E. Smith, also in Skaneateles.

=== Ownership ===
In September 1849, the home and 113.78 of the original remaining acres were sold by DeZeng's estate (who died in 1848) to John Legg for $10,000. A month later, in October, Legg sold the house to farmer Peter Whittlesey for $10,500. Whittlesey owned the home for eight years and further subdivided the property. In March 1857, Whittlesey sold the home to New York City jewelry manufacturer Seth W. Hale for $9,000.

In August 1858, Hale sold the home to Anson H. Lapham (1804–1876) for $8,000. Lapham, a wealthy leather trader, was from a large and prominent family. He was the uncle of New York State Senator Nathan Lapham and was a cousin of Susan B. Anthony (his paternal aunt, Hannah Lapham Anthony, was Susan's grandmother), who visited the home frequently with fellow suffragist Elizabeth Cady Stanton. After Lapham's death in 1876, he left the home to his second wife, Amie Ann (née Frost) Willetts Lapham (1816–1893). In November 1878, two years after Lapham's death, his widow sold the home to her son (from her first marriage), William Russell Willetts (1842–1917) for $20,000. In 1887, the Skaneateles Country Club was established and located just down the street from the residence.

In September 1892, Willetts sold the home to Edward Macomber Padelford (1857–1921) who referred to the home as Lakota, for $20,000. With his first wife, Florence McPheeters, Edward was the father of Florence Burne Padelford, who married Robert Grosvenor, 3rd Baron Ebury in 1908. His second wife was Fannie (née Smythe) Woolsey, the sister of New York society matriarch Helen Smythe Jaffray, and the two spent much time abroad, leading Padelford to sell the property in 1899.

=== Roosevelt years ===
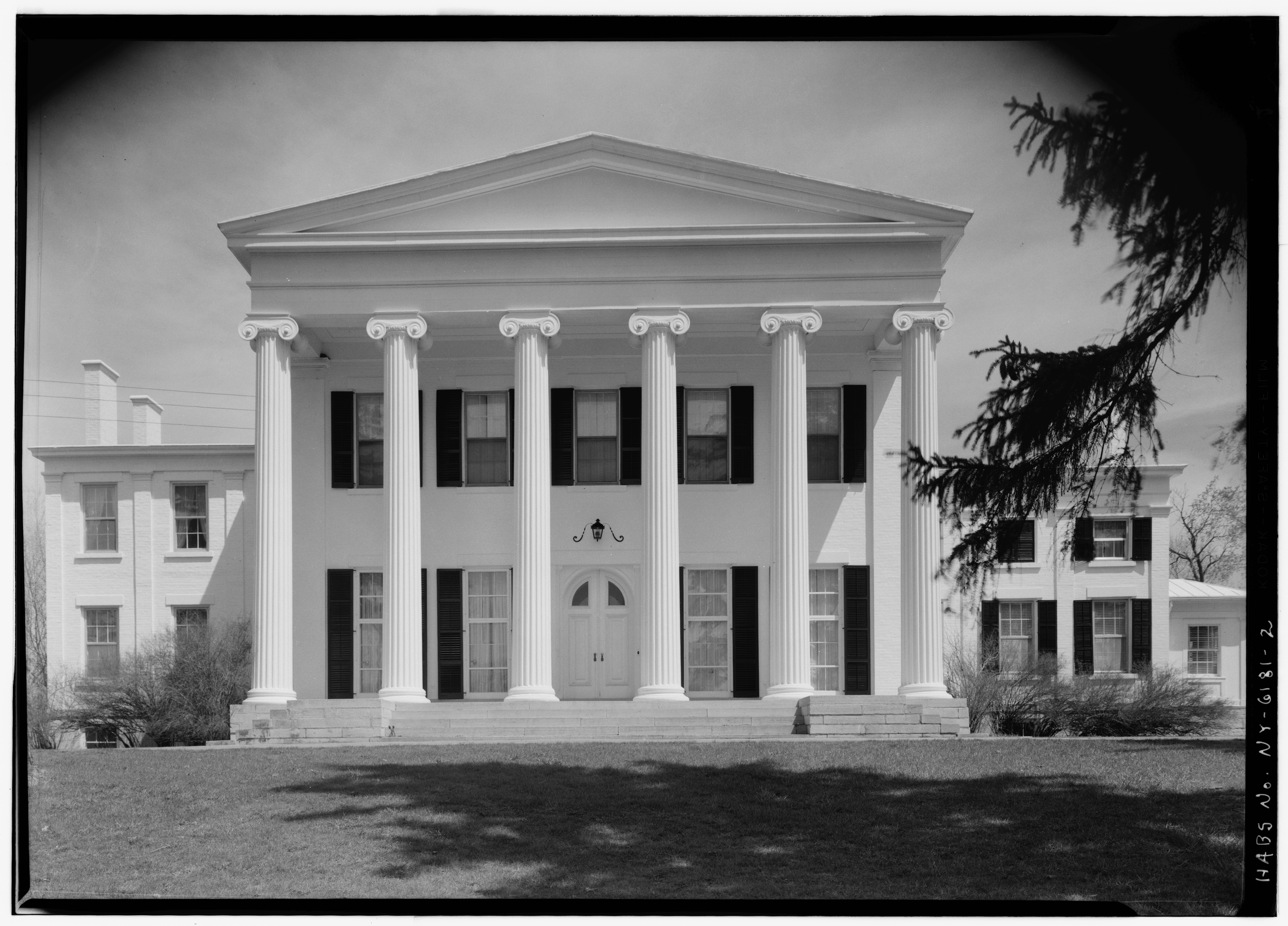
Front elevation

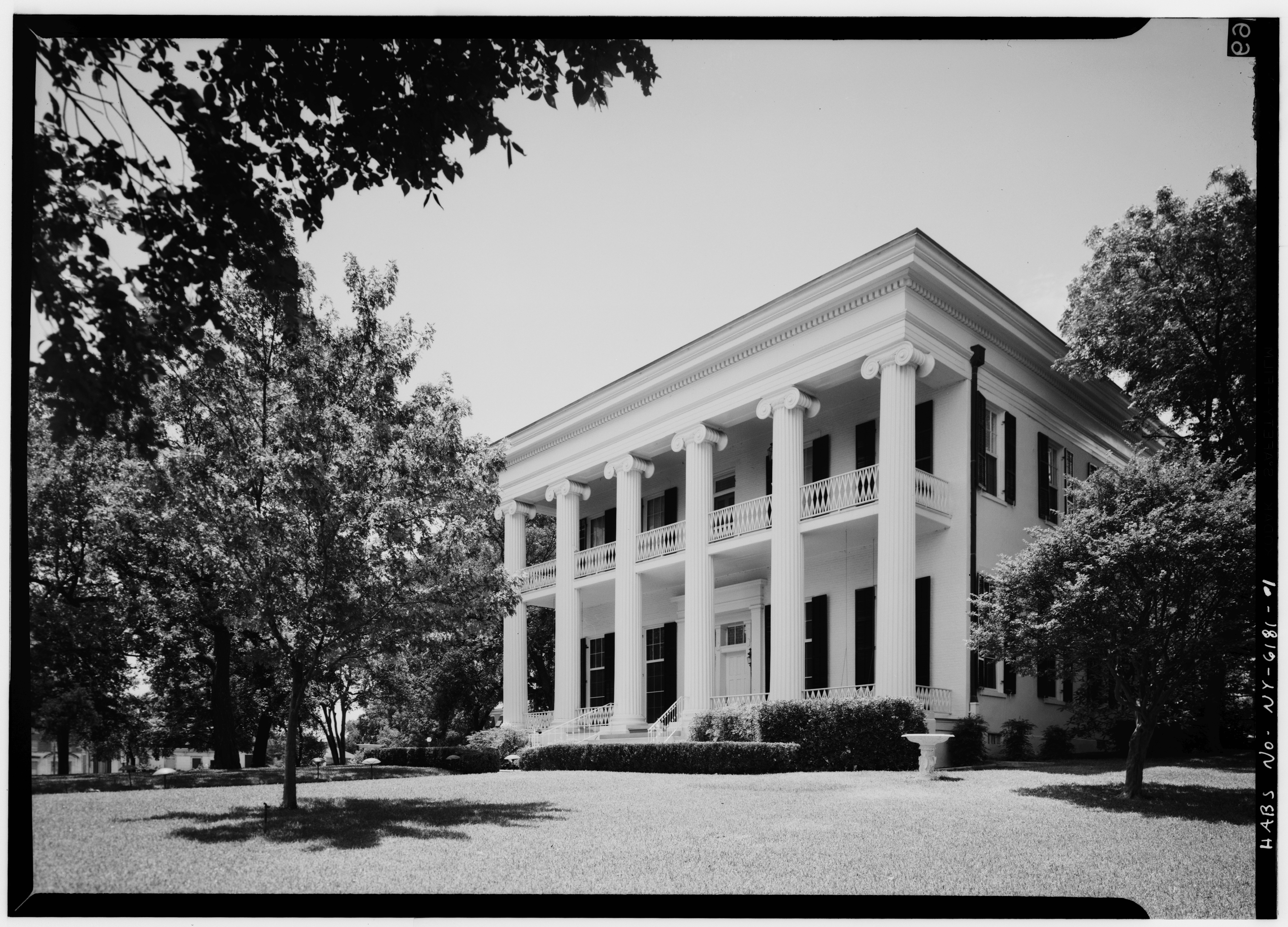
View of front

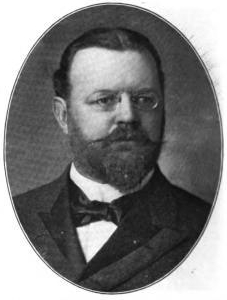
Samuel Montgomery Roosevelt.

In 1899, Padelford sold it to his friend, the artist Samuel Montgomery Roosevelt (1857–1920), a grandson of Nicholas Roosevelt and a second cousin of President Theodore Roosevelt. Padelford and Roosevelt were both members of the New York Yacht Club and the Knickerbocker Club. He used it as a summer home, with his main residence being 1032 Fifth Avenue in New York City. Roosevelt was married to Augusta Eccleston (née Shoemaker) Boylston. In 1905, her daughter, aspiring actress Augusta Boylston was married to attorney Donald Campbell, son of Major General John Campbell, at St. James Episcopal Church in Skaneateles and the reception was held at Roosevelt Hall.

In 1906, Roosevelt hired architect Gaggin & Gaggin to renovate the property, which included taking out the painted woodwork on the first floor and finishing all the rooms and halls with white quartered oak. Elaborate wainscoting, panel work, and a new staircase were added at this time.

Roosevelt, who entertained extensively at the home (cousin Theodore visited in 1915), died in 1920. In his will, instead of leaving the home to his widow, he left it to his nephew, Col. Henry Latrobe "Harry" Roosevelt (1879–1936). Henry was married to Eleanor Morrow, daughter of William W. Morrow, a Judge and U.S. Representative.

In 1923, the Roosevelts entertain Don Juan Riaño y Gayangos, the Spanish Ambassador to the U.S. during the reign of Alfonso XIII of Spain, at Roosevelt Hall. In 1930, then Governor of New York, Franklin D. Roosevelt, along with his wife Eleanor and son John, stop to visit and have lunch at the Hall. In 1932, Franklin visits again, this time while running for president. After he wins the presidency, Franklin appoints Harry Assistant Secretary of the Navy, a role he serves in until his death in 1936.

After Harry's death, the home passed to his eldest son, Maj. William Morrow Roosevelt (1906–1983). William, who owned the house while serving with the U.S. Military in Guam, sold the home in 1944 to William H. Delavan.

=== Later owners ===
In 1961, Delavan sold the home to Kenneth M. Dunning, who developed Lake View Circle and sold a portion of the estate to Thomas Rich in 1963. Reportedly, Robert F. Kennedy considered buying the house when he was running for the U.S. Senate in 1964.

In 1967, Dunning sold Roosevelt Hall to Dennis Owen, who, in 1974, built a separate home for himself on the property and donated the mansion to the De La Salle Christian Brothers. The home was later transferred to the Franciscan Friars in 2001. In 2007, the home reverted to Owen, who sold it to current owners, Mary and Peter Drescher, who use it as their summer home.
