= Henry A. Smythe =

American politician

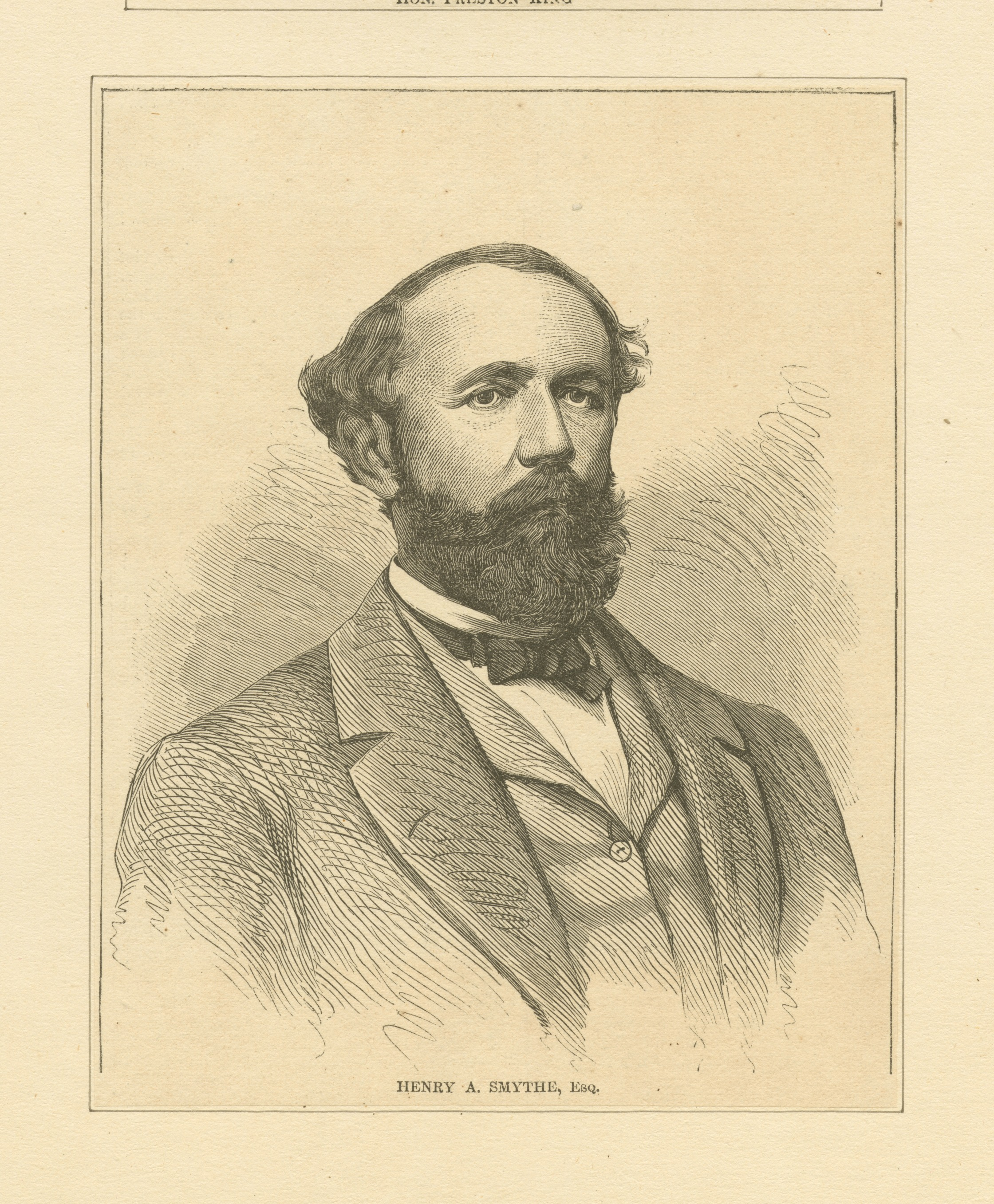

18th Collector of the Port of New York
- In office May 16, 1866 – 1869
- Appointed by: Andrew Johnson
- Preceded by: Charles P. Clinch (Acting)
- Succeeded by: Moses H. Grinnell

Personal details
- Born: Henry Augustus Smythe; 1817 Hobart, New York, U.S.
- Died: May 19, 1884 (aged 66–67) New York City, New York, U.S.
- Party: Whig, Republican
- Spouse: Mary Franklin
- Children: 3, including Helen
- Profession: Banker

Henry Augustus Smythe (1817 – May 19, 1884) was an American politician who served as a Collector of Customs from 1866 to 1869.

== Early life ==
Smythe was born in 1817 in Hobart, Delaware County, New York. His father, a prominent lawyer, was one of the earliest settlers of the area and his grandfather, Anthony Marvine, also a lawyer, was a member of the New York State Assembly from Delaware County, 1804-1806.

== Career ==
After receiving his education, Smythe came to New York in 1836 and clerked in one of the "large jobbing and importing houses" that was formed in 1839, later becoming a partner and then joining the Boston commission house of F. Skinner & Co. in 1846, remaining until 1857. In 1856, while traveling in a carriage from Bern to Basel in Switzerland, Smythe met and befriended novelist Herman Melville, who he later secured a job for as an inspector of customs when Smythe was the Collector of the Port of New York.

In 1857, he established the house of Smythe, Sprague & Cooper, along with Marvelle Wilson Cooper, where he was the managing partner until 1864 when he retired upon his election as president of the Central National Bank, which he also helped establish.

=== Collector of the Port of New York ===
Smythe remained a leader of Central National Bank into 1866, and a director of the Bank of Commerce, when he was appointed Collector of the Port of New York by President Andrew Johnson on May 16, 1866. At the time of his appointment, he was referred to by The New York Times as "a man of much energy of character, excellent business capacity, and will prove eminently efficient in the discharge of his duties. He was originally a Whig in politics, then a Republican, and is a thorough Union Man".

He is most well known for his impeachment in March 1867, which accused him of corruption and, with a resolution for his removal of office from the House, was ultimately ignored by President Andrew Johnson. Smythe left office in 1869, after a change of administration.

=== Later career ===
In 1869, Smythe was tabled by the Senate for the position of United States Ambassador to Russia and did not receive his commission and Andrew Gregg Curtin was appointed by President Grant instead. In 1872, Smythe, then a millionaire and citizen of Prince George's County, Maryland, was the president of the New York State Trust and Loan Company and was instrumental in the building of the Southern Maryland Railroad. In 1874, he leased the former home of Charles A. Foote back in Hobart, New York.

== Personal life ==
Smythe was married to Mary Franklin (c. 1816–1894). Together, they were the parents of three daughters known as the "three handsome Smythe girls":

- Frances "Fannie" Smythe (d. 1911), who was the second wife of Edward Padelford (1857–1921), the owner of Roosevelt Hall in Skaneateles, New York.
- Helen Smythe (1850–1932), who became prominent in New York society and married William Phillips Jaffray (1845–1887), a successful New York dry goods merchant.

Smythe died at the residence of his son-in-law, William Jaffray, in New York City on May 19, 1884. "Gradual paralysis had made him an invalid several years."

Government offices
Preceded by Charles P. Clinch (Acting)	Collector of the Port of New York; 1866–1869	Succeeded by Moses H. Grinnell
