= Henry Smythe =

Henry Smythe may refer to:

- Henry A. Smythe (1819–?), American politician
- Henry Maxwell Smythe, American diplomat, ambassador to Haiti
- Henry Smythe, a character in the animated Spider-Man series, based on Spencer Smythe
