= Samuel M. Roosevelt =

American painter (1857–1920)

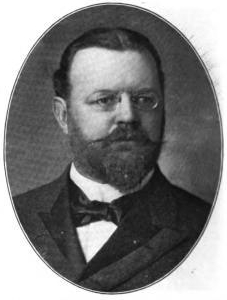
- Born: February 20, 1857; New York City, New York, U.S.
- Died: August 19, 1920 (aged 63); Knickerbocker Club, New York City, New York, U.S.
- Education: Art Students League of New York
- Spouse: Augusta Eccleston Shoemaker Boylston (m. 1885)
- Parent(s): Samuel Roosevelt; Mary Jane Horton
- Relatives: See Roosevelt family
- Awards: Legion of Honour

Samuel Montgomery Roosevelt (February 20, 1857 – August 19, 1920) was an American artist and merchant from New York City.

== Early life ==
Roosevelt was born on February 20, 1857, in New York City. He was the son of prominent businessman Samuel Roosevelt (1813–1878) and Mary Jane (née Horton) Roosevelt (1823–1901). His brother was Nicholas Latrobe Roosevelt, the father of Henry Latrobe Roosevelt, who served as the Assistant Secretary of the Navy under their distant cousin, Franklin D. Roosevelt.

His paternal grandparents were Nicholas Roosevelt, an inventor involved with the steamboat, and Lydia Sellon (née Latrobe) Roosevelt, daughter of his grandfather's friend and business partner, architect Benjamin Henry Latrobe.

He was educated at St. John's School in Ossining, New York, and studied art at the Art Students League of New York and in Paris, and studied painting under Jean-Joseph Benjamin-Constant and Jean-Paul Laurens.

== Career ==
A wine merchant by trade, he was also an accomplished portrait artist, he is remembered for his portraits of his distant cousin Theodore Roosevelt, Oliver Belmont, Antonio de La Gandara, Hudson Maxim, Henry F. Shoemaker, and others. His work was exhibited at the Paris Salon and the National Academy of Design and in Philadelphia and Chicago. He was President of the National Association of Portrait Painters from 1912 until his death. He was also New York City Commissioner of Schools.

Roosevelt was also an active sportsman, skilled at fencing and interested in yachting. He went to Colorado in 1878 on ranching and scouting expeditions with the ninth cavalry against the Ute Indians, and was described as having been a "cowboy" for a period by a cousin upon his death. He entertained frequently and gained notoriety for once serving a whole roasted baby lion to guests. He was a chevalier of the French Legion of Honor.

== Personal life ==
He married Augusta Eccleston (née Shoemaker) Boylston of Baltimore on May 5, 1885. She was a daughter of Samuel Moor Shoemaker (1821–1884), a vice president and key figure in the Adams Express Company whose great-grandfather Samuel Shoemaker and great-great-grandfather Benjamin Shoemaker were mayors of Philadelphia.

In 1899, he bought a 25-room mansion on Skaneateles Lake in Skaneateles, New York (on land that his grandfather had sold, land that made up part of the town). Theodore Roosevelt visited in 1915, and Franklin Delano Roosevelt twice; Robert F. Kennedy considered buying the house when he was running for the U.S. Senate in 1964.

Roosevelt died at the Knickerbocker Club in New York City on August 19, 1920. At the time of his death, he lived at 44 West 77th Street in New York City. After his death, he left practically his entire estate, including Roosevelt Hall in Skaneateles, New York, to his nephew, Henry.
