= Helen Smythe Jaffray =

American socialite

- Born: Helen Smythe; December 12, 1850; New York City, U.S.
- Died: July 11, 1932 (aged 81); Paris, France
- Spouse: William Phillips Jaffray (m. 1871; died 1887)
- Children: 3, including Helen
- Parent(s): Henry A. Smythe; Mary Franklin

Helen Smythe Jaffray (November 4, 1850 – July 11, 1932) was an American socialite during the Gilded Age.

== Early life ==
Helen was born on November 4, 1850, in New York City. She was one of the "three handsome Smythe girls" born to Henry A. Smythe and Mary (née Franklin) Smythe. Her father, a merchant, banker and conservative Union Republican, was a Collector of Customs in New York from 1866 to 1869 (alongside Herman Melville) under President Andrew Johnson, who is most well known for his impeachment in March 1867, following accusations of corruption. He was later nominated for the position of U.S. Ambassador to Russia by President Ulysses S. Grant in 1869, but was tabled by the Senate and did not receive his commission (Andrew Gregg Curtin was appointed instead). Helen's sister Fannie Smythe, was the second wife of Edward Padelford, who had a home (now known as Roosevelt Hall), in Skaneateles, New York.

== Society life ==
In 1892, both Helen and her daughter were listed as "Mrs. William Jaffray" and "Miss Jaffray", in Ward McAllister's "Four Hundred", purported to be an index of New York's best families, published in The New York Times. Conveniently, 400 was the number of people that could fit into Mrs. Astor's ballroom.

== Personal life ==
In 1871, Helen was married to William Phillips Jaffray (1845–1887), a successful New York dry goods merchant. William was the eldest son of Edward Somerville Jaffray and an uncle to Florence Jaffray, who served as U.S. Minister to Norway and was the wife of J. Borden Harriman. Florence was raised by William's parents, at 615 Fifth Avenue, as her parents both died young. Together, they were the parents of:

- Mary Franklin Jaffray (1872–1962), who married her cousin Edward Woodriff Jaffray (1863–1939), the son of her grandfather's brother, Arthur Woodriff Jaffray, in 1893.
- Arthur Woodriff Jaffray (1876–1919), who married actress Laura D. Shorter in 1899. They divorced and he married his first cousin, Mabel Evelyn Jaffray (1880–1922), daughter of Howard S. Jaffray in 1906.
- Helen Frances Jaffray (1885–1929), who was popular in New York and London society and a close friend of Margaretta Armstrong Drexel, Viscountess Maidstone, the wife of the Earl of Winchilsea. Helen married Harvard graduate Walter Abbott (1867–1919) in 1912. After his death, she married J. Kingsley Rooker and lived at Mortimer House in Clifton.

Her husband died in Astoria in September 1877 and his funeral was held at the Church of the Transfiguration. Jaffray died on July 11, 1932, in Paris, France, where she lived at 27 rue de Longchamp. She was buried in the family vault at the Saint-Germain-en-Laye Cemetery.
