= List of impeachment investigations of United States federal officials =

Numerous federal officials in the United States have been threatened with impeachment and removal from office. Despite numerous impeachment investigations and votes to impeach a number of presidents by the House of Representatives, only three presidents in U.S. history have had articles of impeachment approved: Andrew Johnson, Bill Clinton, and Donald Trump (twice), all of which were acquitted in the Senate. Impeachment proceedings against both John Tyler and Richard Nixon began and made it out of committee, but Nixon resigned before the actual debate on the floor of the House began. To date, no president impeached by the House of Representatives has ever been removed from office by the Senate.

== Presidents ==
While there have been demands for the impeachment of most presidents, only three — Andrew Johnson in 1868, Bill Clinton in 1999 and Donald Trump in 2019— have actually been impeached. A second impeachment of Donald Trump was adopted, making him the first US President to be impeached twice. All three were acquitted by the United States Senate and not removed from office. Removal requires an impeachment vote from the House of Representatives and a conviction from the Senate. Impeachment proceedings against two other presidents, John Tyler and Richard Nixon made it out of committee, but Nixon resigned in 1974 before the actual debate on the floor of the House began. Every president elected since 1980, with the exception of Barack Obama, has been the subject of at least one resolution introduced into Congress with the purpose of impeachment.

The following presidents have had resolutions introduced to initiate proceedings and many have gotten to the hearing stage.

=== John Tyler (Whig) ===
After President John Tyler vetoed the bill to introduce tariffs, a committee led by former President John Quincy Adams condemn Tyler's use of a veto and considered that he should be impeached. However, in 1843, the first impeachment proposal against Tyler was not successful with a total of 127-83 votes, as they all knew that Tyler's likely acquittal would likely upset the Whig party.

=== James Buchanan (Democrat) ===
During most of 1860, the "Covode Committee" held hearings on whether to impeach President James Buchanan. While it found no real cause suitable enough for the proposal to impeach Buchanan, it did find that his administration was the most corrupt since the foundation of the Republic.

=== Andrew Johnson (National Union; formerly Democrat) ===
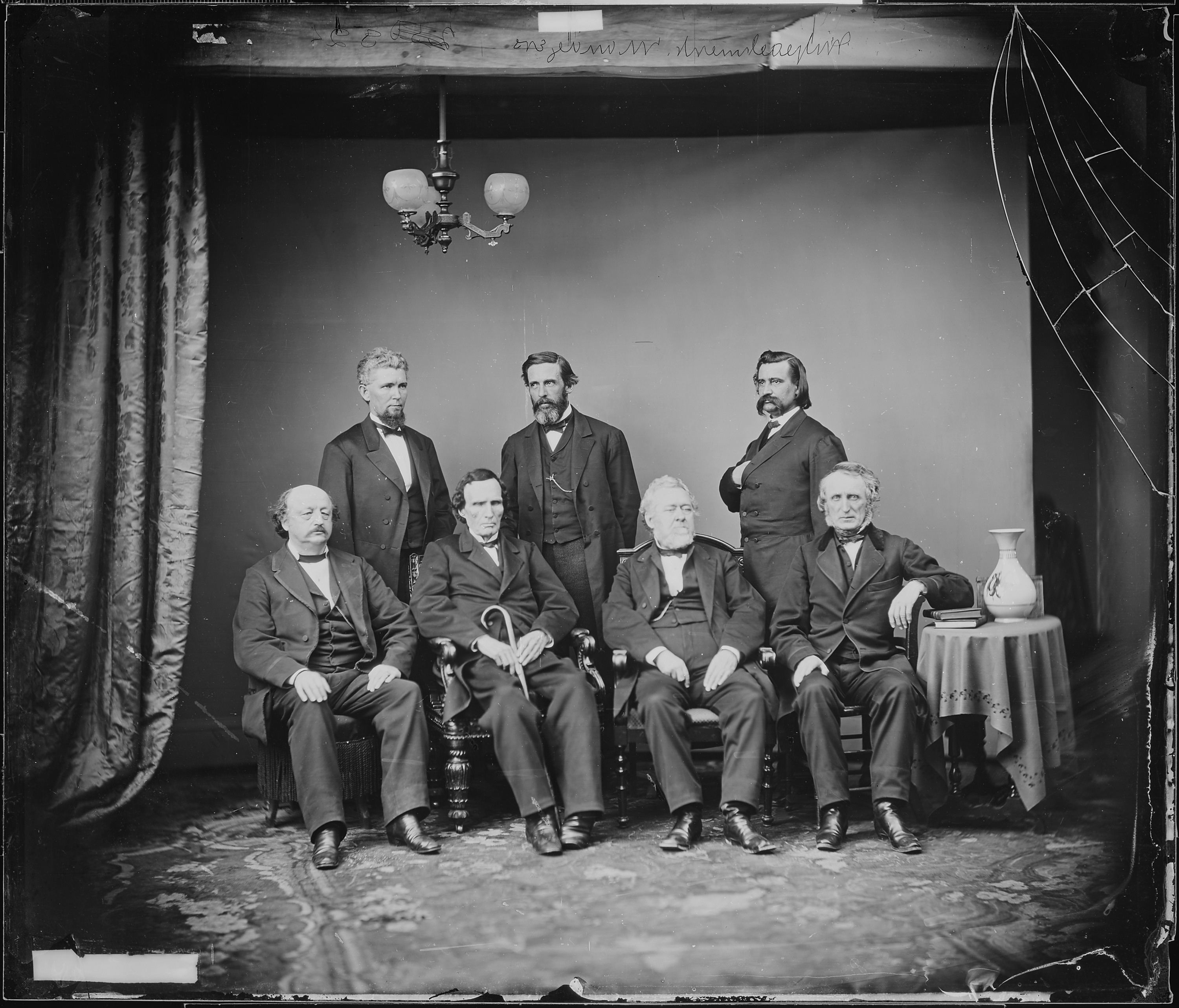
The 1868 House impeachment committee

Several attempts were made to remove President Andrew Johnson from office. The first occurred on January 7, 1867, when Rep. James M. Ashley of Ohio, introduced a resolution accusing him of corruption. On November 21, 1867, the House Judiciary Committee produced a bill of impeachment that consisted of a vast collection of complaints against Johnson. After a furious debate, a formal vote was held in the House of Representatives on December 5, 1867, which failed 57-108. Another impeachment vote the following year succeeded, and a Senate trial acquitted Johnson by one vote.

=== Richard M. Nixon (Republican) ===
President Richard Nixon leaving the White House on Marine One shortly before his resignation became effective, August 9, 1974

On October 30, 1973, the House Judiciary Committee began consideration of the possible impeachment of Richard Nixon. The initial straight party-line votes by a 21–17 margin that established an impeachment inquiry were focused around how extensive the subpoena powers Peter W. Rodino would have would be.

After a three-month-long investigation, and with public pressure to impeach the president growing, the House passed a resolution, H.Res. 803, on February 6, 1974, that gave the Judiciary Committee authority to actually investigate charges against the President. The hearings lasted until the summer when, after much wrangling, the Judiciary Committee voted three articles of impeachment to the floor of the House, the furthest an impeachment proceeding had progressed in over a century.

With the release of new tapes — after the administration lost the case of US v. Nixon — and with impeachment and removal by the Senate all but certain, on August 9, 1974, Nixon became the first and only president to resign.

=== Bill Clinton (Democrat) ===
In 1998, the Clinton–Lewinsky scandal and the Starr Report, an impeachment inquiry was launched against President Bill Clinton. Clinton was ultimately impeached in December 1998, and was acquitted in his impeachment trial in early 1999.

=== Donald Trump (Republican) ===
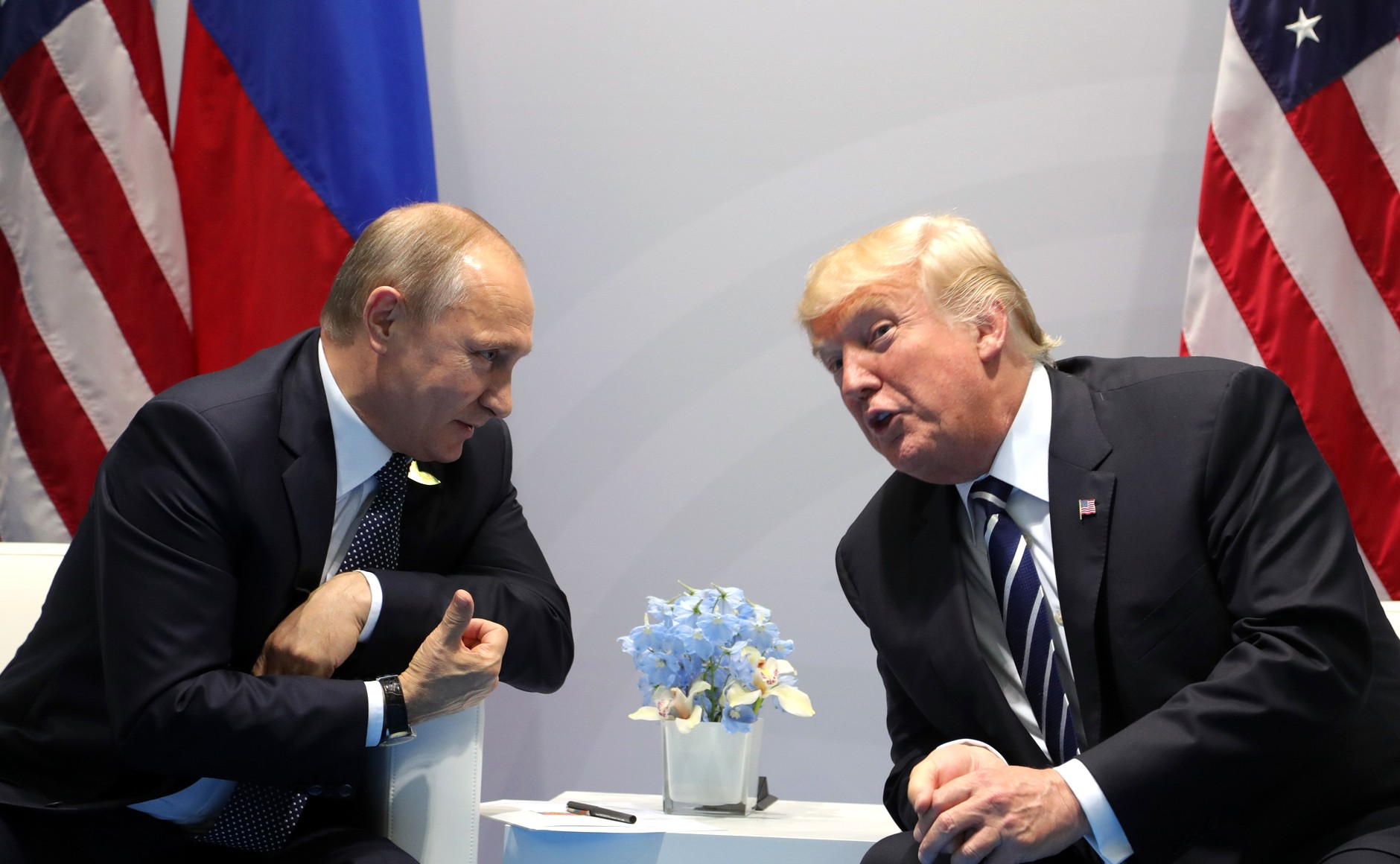
Vladimir Putin and Trump at the G20 Hamburg summit

Within weeks of taking office, members of Congress declared that President Trump may have committed impeachable offences in relation with Executive Order 13769. On July 12, 2017, Representative Al Green (D) and Representative Brad Sherman (D) introduced H. Res. 438, exhibiting one article of impeachment. This and later motions were eventually tabled by a large majority or died in committee.

On September 24, 2019, Speaker of the House Nancy Pelosi announced an impeachment inquiry into President Trump based on allegations laid out in a whistleblower report. A resolution enacting a rules package to govern the investigation was passed on 31 October by a vote of 232–196 in which all Republicans and two Democrats voted against the resolution. Public impeachment hearings began in the House on 13 November, and on December 10, 2019, the House Judiciary Committee published two articles of impeachment against President Trump, charging him with abuse of power and obstruction of Congress. Trump was impeached by the House of Representatives on December 18, 2019. The impeachment trial of Donald Trump was then held from January 16 to February 5, 2020, with the Republican-controlled Senate acquitting Trump.

Trump was impeached for the second time on January 13, 2021, for incitement of insurrection, after the storming of the United States Capitol one week earlier. The Senate trial began February 9, 2021, and concluded on February 13, 2021.

=== Joe Biden (Democrat) ===
On September 12, 2023, Kevin McCarthy, the then-speaker of the United States House of Representatives, announced an impeachment inquiry into President Joe Biden. The inquiry was conducted by the House's Judiciary, Oversight and Ways and Means committees. James Comer, chairman of the Oversight Committee, was named to lead the investigation.

Speaker McCarthy had twelve days earlier said an inquiry would require a majority House vote. He initiated the inquiry by stating that recent House investigations allegedly "paint a picture of corruption" by Joe Biden and his family, particularly regarding that the President had benefitted from the foreign business dealings of Hunter Biden.

On December 13, 2023, the House of Representatives voted 221–212 to formalize the inquiry. Lawmakers voted along party lines to back a resolution that Republicans said gave them more power to gather evidence and enforce legal demands.

== Vice Presidents ==
As of March 22, no Vice President has been impeached, but one has had an impeachment investigation against him.

=== John C. Calhoun (Democratic-Republican) ===
In 1826, Vice President John C. Calhoun himself requested a House impeachment inquiry be launched into him regarding allegations that he had profited from a contract during his tenure as United States secretary of war. His request was granted, and a House select committee conducted an impeachment inquiry which, in only a matter of weeks, found Calhoun innocent of wrongdoing.

== Cabinet secretaries ==
=== Secretary of War William Belknap (Democrat before 1865, Republican 1865-1890) ===
In 1876, William W. Belknap was impeached by a unanimous vote of the House of Representatives shortly after he had resigned for allegedly having received money in return for post tradership appointments. Speaker of the House Michael C. Kerr wrote to the Senate that Belknap resigned "with intent to evade the proceedings of impeachment against him." Belknap was tried by the Senate, which ruled by a vote of 37–29 that it had jurisdiction despite the resignation. The vote on conviction fell short of the two-thirds required, with 35 to 37 votes for each article and 25 votes against each. Two of those voting for conviction, 22 of those voting for acquittal, and one who declined to vote said they felt that the Senate did not have jurisdiction due to Belknap's resignation.

As of February 2025, Belknap has been the only cabinet secretary to have been impeached by the House and tried by the Senate.

=== Attorney General Harry M. Daugherty (Republican) ===
In 1922, the House Judiciary Committee held hearings on whether to impeach Attorney General Harry Daugherty. Despite evidence of wrongdoing, impeachment articles were not reported to the full House.

However it was his alleged knowledge of a kickback scam involving bootleggers (operated by his chief aide Jess Smith) that led to his eventual resignation on March 28, 1924. As the subject of a U.S. Senate investigation begun the year before, spearheaded under the direction of Senator Burton K. Wheeler of Montana, Daugherty, was eventually found not guilty in the investigation.

=== Secretary of the Treasury Andrew Mellon (Republican) ===
In January 1932, Rep. Wright Patman and others introduced articles of impeachment against Andrew Mellon, with hearings before the House Judiciary Committee at the end of that month. After the hearings were over, but before the scheduled vote on whether to report the articles to the full House, Mellon accepted an appointment to the post of Ambassador to the Court of St. James, and resigned, thus rendering further action on the issue moot.

=== Secretary of the Treasury William Woodin, Eugene Meyer, Andrew Mellon and Federal Reserve Board (All Republicans) ===
On May 23, 1933 Rep. Louis Thomas McFadden introduced articles of impeachment against Eugene Meyer, Secretary of the Treasury William Woodin, two former Treasury Secretaries (Andrew Mellon and Ogden L. Mills); J. F. T. O'Connor (Comptroller of Currency); John W. Pole (former Comptroller of Currency); four members and three former members of the Federal Reserve Board; twelve Federal Reserve Agents; and one former Federal Reserve Agent. There was a hearing on the subject before the House Judiciary Committee, but nothing became of it.

=== Labor Secretary Francis Perkins (Democrat), Immigration and Naturalization Commissioner James Houghteling, and Solicitor of the Department of Labor Gerard Reilly ===
On January 24, 1939, Rep. J. Parnell Thomas offered an impeachment resolution against the above federal officials. The resolution was referred to the Judiciary Committee, where it died a quiet death.

Congressional conservatives were angered with Secretary Francis Perkins when she had refused to deport Harry Bridges, the head of the International Longshore and Warehouse Union. Bridges, an Australian longshoreman who came to America in 1920, was accused of being a Communist.

=== Secretary of Homeland Security Alejandro Mayorkas (Democrat) ===
On November 13, 2023, a motion to impeach Mayorkas was sent to the Homeland Security Committee by Congress. Three months later, the Committee voted to advance the motion to the floor. On February 6, 2024, the impeachment failed to pass in the House by a margin of 214-216, with four Republican votes against. On February 13, 2024, the impeachment passed in the House by a margin of 214-213, with three Republicans against. The Senate dismissed both articles without trial on April 17 in two votes along party lines. (Note: Republicans voted against dismissal except Lisa Murkowski, who voted "present" on one article.)

=== Pete Hegseth ===
There have been several attempts to impeach Hegseth.

In December 2025, Shri Thanedar introduced articles of impeachment (H.Res. 935) in the house against Pete Hegseth.

Then, on April 15, 2026, Yassamin Ansari introduced articles. These died in Judiciary committee.

On September 15, Thomas Massie (R-KY), introduced articles of impeachment against him. As a member of the majority, the resolution was privileged, but House Speaker Mike Johnson adjourned Congress until after the midterms rather than put it to a vote. He later put it to a vote again on November 10, where the vote failed.

=== Robert F. Kennedy Jr. ===
In December 2025, Haley Stevens introduced articles of impeachment (H.Res. 944) in the house against Robert F. Kennedy Jr..

=== Kristi Noem ===
In January 2026, Robin Kelly introduced articles of impeachment (H.Res. 996) in the house against Kristi Noem.

=== Pam Bondi ===
In March 2026, Summer Lee introduced articles of impeachment (H.Res. 1119) in the house against Attorney General Pam Bondi.

== Federal Reserve Board ==
The three attempts to remove all or part of the Federal Reserve Board failed.

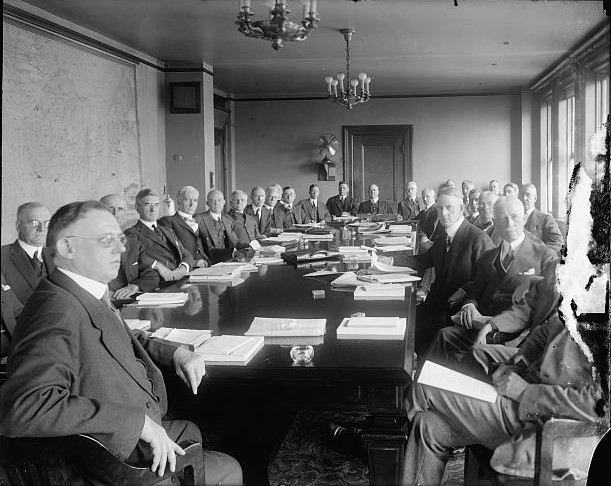
Board of Governors meeting January 1, 1922.

=== Lindbergh's attempt ===
On February 12, 1917, Rep Charles Lindbergh, Sr., father of the aviator, offered articles of impeachment against five members of the Federal Reserve Board. The articles were referred to the Judiciary Committee for investigation. On March 3, the Judiciary Committee submitted its report, H.R. Rep. 64-1628, finding insufficient evidence to support impeachment.

=== McFadden's attempt ===
Rep. Louis Thomas McFadden's attempt to impeach numerous officials in May 1933 is detailed above.

=== Gonzalez's attempt ===
On March 7, 1985, Rep. Henry Gonzalez introduced an impeachment resolution, H.R. Res. 101, against Fed Chairman Paul Volcker and ten other members of the Federal Open Market Committee and H.R. Res. 102, against Volcker alone. The resolution was referred to the Judiciary Committee, where it was never heard of again. However, not to be deterred, Gonzalez introduced the bill in each of the next two congresses, and they met the same fate.

== Other officials ==
=== Henry A. Smythe – Collector, Port of New York ===
On March 22, 1867, three resolutions were introduced calling for various types of action against the allegedly corrupt Henry A. Smythe. Rep. Hulburd introduced a resolution calling for the President to remove Smythe from office. Mr. Stevens offered an impeachment resolution against Smythe and called upon the Committee on Public Expenditures to draft articles of impeachment. Finally, Rep.Samuel Shellabarger of Ohio introduced a resolution requesting the Committee on Public Expenditures investigate Smythe's conduct.

The next day, the House resumed debate over these three resolutions. A different resolution was ultimately adopted which did not call for Smythe's impeachment, but rather his immediate removal from office by the President. A copy of the resolution was sent to President Andrew Johnson, who ignored it. Smythe left office in 1869 with the change in administration.

=== Charles Francis Adams, Ambassador to the Court of St. James, and William E. West, American Consul at Dublin ===
On December 2, 1867, Rep. William E. Robinson of New York introduced a resolution to investigate Charles Francis Adams, Sr. and William E. West, and why they had not tried to get some American citizens out of jail there. The resolution was then referred to the Foreign Relations Committee, where it died.

=== Oliver B. Bradford, consular clerk of the United States, assigned to Shanghai, China, and postal agent of the United States there ===
In a resolution introduced by Rep. William M. Springer, of Illinois, Bradford was accused of fraud, embezzlement and numerous other charges in relation to the building of a Cross China railroad. While all agreed it was criminal, it was not agreed whether or not the office was high enough to warrant impeachment.

=== George F. Seward, Minister plenipotentiary to China ===
On March 3, 1879, as part of the regular order of business was the report of the Committee on Expenditures in the State Department, Rep Springer proposed articles of impeachment against George F. Seward for bribery and theft. The articles were sent to the Judiciary committee, where they died.

=== Lot Wright, United States marshal ===
On December 2, 1884, Rep. John F. Follett, of Ohio introduced a point of privilege demanding that Wright be impeached for using armed deputies to fix an election. The proposition was held to be out of order.

=== Clarence Chase – Collector of Customs, Port of El Paso, Texas ===
Chase was implicated in a Senate hearing before the Committee of Public Lands and Surveys as part of the Tea Pot Dome investigations. The Senate, on March 25, 1924, adopted a resolution, S. Res. 195, referring the matter to the House of Representatives for such proceedings as might be appropriate against Chase. The resolution was referred to the Judiciary Committee. The next day, Chase resigned from office, and no further action was taken by the House.

=== H. Snowden Marshall--U.S. District Atty., Southern District of NY ===
On December 14, 1915. Rep. Frank Buchanan of Illinois demanded the impeachment of H. Snowden Marshall, United States District Attorney for the Southern District of New York, for alleged neglect of duty and subservience to "the great criminal trusts," The Chicago Tribune claimed it had been In an effort to stop the grand jury investigation into the activities of Labor's National Peace council.

About a month later, on Buchanan again offered a resolution, H.R. Res. 90, to investigate Marshall. This time the resolution was adopted and referred to the Judiciary Committee for further action.

On January 27, 1916, the House passed a resolution, H.R. Res. 110, granting the Judiciary Committee authority to subpoena witnesses and to use a Subcommittee. A few days later, a Subcommittee of the Judiciary Committee was organized to take testimony. On April 5, the HJC reported its findings, H.R. Rep. No. 64-494, to the House. The Judiciary Committee recommended a Select Committee be appointed to further investigate Marshall. Rep. Kitchins offered a resolution, H.R. Res. 193, to adopt the Judiciary Committee's recommendations. The resolution passed and the Select Committee was formed. The Select Committee report was read into the record on April 14. The report found Marshall guilty of a breach of the privileges of the House and in contempt of the House of Representatives and recommended he be brought to the bar of the House to answer the charges.

On June 20, a resolution, H.R. Res. 268, was submitted which charged Marshall with violating the privileges of the House of Representatives and calling the Speaker to issue a warrant for Marshall's arrest. The resolution was adopted. On June 22, the Speaker signed the warrant.

When Marshall was arrested by the Sergeant at Arms on June 26, he served the Sergeant at Arms with a writ of habeas corpus. The HJC voted to end the investigation on July 16. Marshall's writ eventually went to the United States Supreme Court where Chief Justice White issued the opinion of the court on April 23, 1917. The Court granted the writ and released Marshall from custody. [Marshall v. Gordon, 243 U.S. 521 (1916)].

The Judiciary Committee submitted its last report, H.R. Rep. 64-1077, concerning impeachment efforts against Marshall on August 4, the report, which recommended against impeachment, was referred to the House Calendar.

=== Frederick Fenning – Commissioner, District of Columbia ===
On April 19, 1926, articles of impeachment against Commissioner Frederick A. Fenning were read on the floor of the House, and a resolution, H.R. Res. 228, to investigate the validity of the charges was adopted. The resolution was referred to the Judiciary Committee. On May 4, 1926, the Judiciary Committee submitted a report, H.R. Rep. No. 69-1075, recommending a complete investigation. A resolution adopting the committee report was passed by the House on May 6, 1926.

On June 9, 1926, Rep. John Rankin submitted a brief to the investigating committee supporting Fenning's impeachment. Then on June 16, 1926, after Fenning answered the charges, Rankin submitted a reply brief.

Two committees were involved in the impeachment investigation of Fenning. A preliminary report of a Special Subcommittee of the Committee on the District of Columbia was submitted to the House on June 30, 1926. Then on July 1, the final Judiciary Committee report, H.R. Rep. No. 69-1590, was submitted to the House and later referred to the House Calendar. The proceedings ended with his resignation.

=== Liam S. Coonan, Special Crime Strike Force Prosecutor for the United States Department of Justice ===
On June 17, 1975, Rep. Bill Clay introduced an impeachment resolution, H.R. Res. 547, against Liam S. Coonan, for doing something unspecified. It was sent to the HJC, where it died.

=== Richard Helms – Ambassador to Iran ===
On July 29, 1975, Rep. Robert Drinan introduced an impeachment resolution, H.R. Res. 647, against Ambassador Richard Helms for actions taken as Director of the CIA The resolution was referred to the Judiciary Committee. When nothing happened, Fr. Drinan introduced another impeachment resolution, H.R. Res. 1105, against Ambassador Helms on March 24, 1976. This resolution was also sent to the Judiciary Committee., where it also died.

=== Jonathan Goldstein U.S. attorney for the District of New Jersey, and Bruce Goldstein, principal assistant DA ===
On November 20, 1975, Rep Henry Helstoski introduced an impeachment resolution, H.R. Res. 881, against the Goldsteins, for gratuitous prosecution in relation to their investigation of the congressman, which had led to his indictment a month before. It was sent to the HJC, where it died.

=== Paul Rand Dixon, a Commissioner of the Federal Trade Commission ===
On February 9, 1977, Rep. Ed Koch and nine co-sponsors introduced H.R. Res. 274, against Paul Rand Dixon. The resolution was referred to the Judiciary Committee and vanished without a trace.

=== Andrew Young, Ambassador to the United Nations ===
On October 3, 1977, Rep. Lawrence P. McDonald introduced an impeachment resolution, H.R. Res. 805, against Ambassador Andrew Young. The resolution was referred to the Judiciary Committee for action.

Young had met secretly for meetings, in violation of American law, with representatives of the Palestine Liberation Organization, which culminated in Carter asking for Young's resignation. Jimmy Carter denied any complicity in the Andrew Young Affair.

McDonald waited until July 13, 1978, to introduce a second impeachment resolution, H.R. Res. 1267, against him, and this time the resolution was tabled on the House floor.

=== Kenneth W. Starr, an independent counsel of the United States appointed pursuant to 28 United States Code section 593(b) ===
On September 18, 1998, Rep. Alcee Hastings, who himself had been impeached and removed as a federal judge, introduced H.RES.545 impeaching Kenneth Starr, whose investigation was leading to the impeachment of President Bill Clinton. Two days later, the House voted to table the bill, 340–71.

Several weeks later, Hastings introduced H. RES. 582, authorizing an investigation to see whether Starr should be impeached. This was referred to the Rules committee, which buried it.

=== Regina McCarthy, Administrator of the United States Environmental Protection Agency ===
On September 11, 2015, Rep Paul A. Gosar and 25 cosponsors introduced H.RES.417 Impeaching Gina McCarthy, Administrator of the Environmental Protection Agency, for high crimes and misdemeanors. These were entirely claims of alleged perjury. This was referred to the House Judiciary, where it died.

=== John Koskinen, Commissioner of the Internal Revenue Service ===
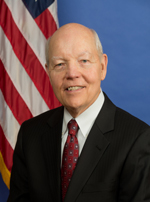
Commissioner Koskinen.

After the Justice Department notified Congress in October 2015 that there would be no charges against Lois Lerner or anyone else in the IRS, 19 Republican members of the House Oversight and Government Reform Committee led by the committee's chairman, Jason Chaffetz (R-Utah), filed a resolution to impeach Koskinen. Those sponsoring the impeachment resolution to remove Koskinen from office accused him of failing to prevent the destruction of evidence in allowing the erasure of back-up tapes containing thousands of e-mails written by Lois Lerner, and of making false statements under oath to Congress. In a statement released by the Committee, Chaffetz said Koskinen "failed to comply with a congressionally issued subpoena, documents were destroyed on his watch, and the public was consistently misled. Impeachment is the appropriate tool to restore public confidence in the IRS and to protect the institutional interests of Congress." The IRS said on October 27 that it did not have an immediate comment on the impeachment resolution. Representative Elijah Cummings (D-Maryland), the committee's top Democrat, said in a statement: "This ridiculous resolution will demonstrate nothing but the Republican obsession with diving into investigative rabbit holes that waste tens of millions of taxpayer dollars while having absolutely no positive impact on a single American. Calling this resolution a 'stunt' or a 'joke' would be insulting to stunts and jokes."

The resolution was referred to the House Judiciary committee, who held hearings on the matter on May 23 and June 22, 2016. The House leadership decided not to proceed any further which led to a discharge petition, which was supposed to be acted upon in September but was delayed until after the election. On December 6, 2016, the House voted to send the question back to the Judiciary Committee, after which it was too late to do anything about it.

=== Rod Rosenstein, Deputy Attorney General ===
On July 25, 2018, after several months of threats, Representatives Mark Meadows and Jim Jordan filed articles of impeachment (H.Res.1028) against Rod Rosenstein for what they say is failure to respond to congressional document demands.

They were immediately sent to the House Judiciary committee. In a speech to donors, Representative Devin Nunes said they would have to wait until after the Senate confirmation of Brett Kavanaugh to the Supreme Court.

While no hearings on the matter were held, the HJC mentioned the situation in its final report on the Clinton email imbroglio and the FBI's early Russia probe.

== Judges ==
Many judges have been investigated.

== Bibliography ==
- Graff, Henry F., ed. (1996). The Presidents: a Reference History (2nd ed.).
- "Volume III, Chapter LXXVII" (PDF). Hinds' Precedents. Archived from the original (PDF) on November 11, 2008.
