= Frances Julia Barnes =

American temperance reformer

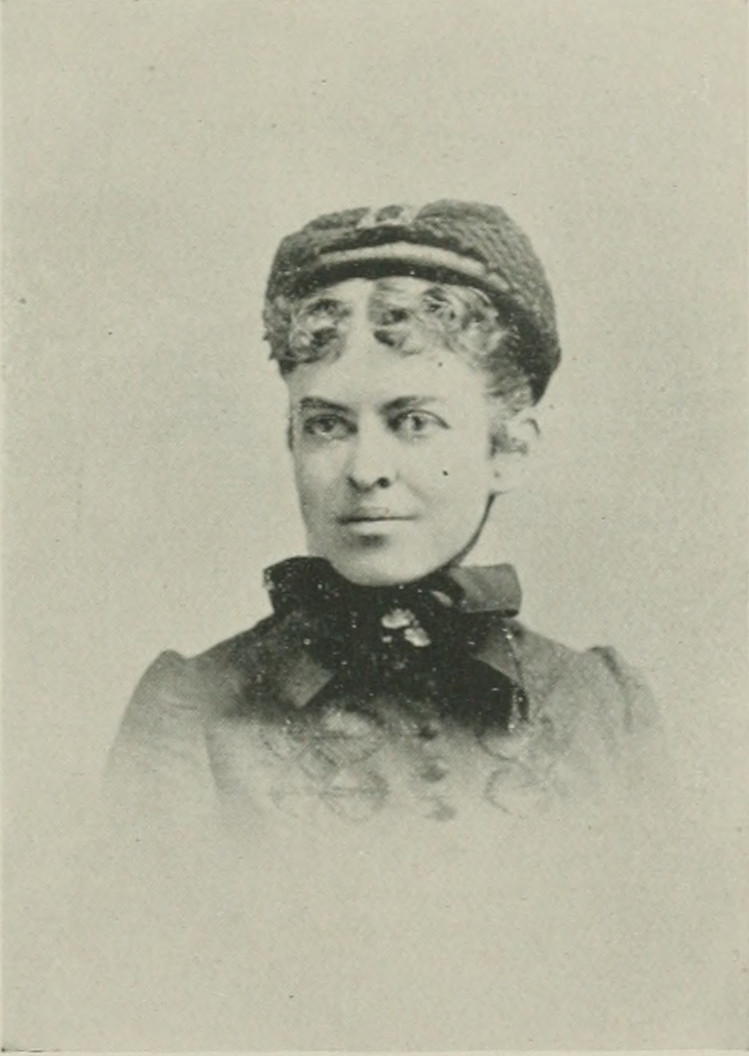
Portrait photo from A Woman of the Century

Frances Julia Barnes (née, Allis; April 14, 1846 – June 16, 1920) was an American temperance reformer. She served as General Secretary of the Young Woman's Branch of the Woman's Christian Temperance Union (WCTU).

== Early life and education ==
Frances Julia Allis was born in Skaneateles, Onondaga County, New York, April 14, 1846. Her parents and ancestors were members of the orthodox society of Friends, of which she was a member. She was a friend of Frances E. Willard and Anna Adams Gordon.

She received her early education in the schools of her native village and was finally graduated at the Packer Collegiate Institute in Brooklyn, New York. After her graduation, her family resided in Brooklyn, during which time she became interested in church and Sunday-school and mission work.

== Career ==
On September 21, 1871, she married Willis A. Barnes, a lawyer of New York City, and made her home for a time in that location. In the fall of 1875, professional business called Mr. Barnes to Chicago, Illinois. Mrs. Barnes accompanied him, and they remained there five years.

Barnes' Quaker training taught her the value of woman's voice and opinion and had prepared her, when the Women's Crusade came, to step into the temperance ranks and "lend her influence" to that cause. Her first public work, however, commenced a few years later when she was living in Chicago. There she became associated with Frances E. Willard in conducting gospel temperance meetings in lower Harwell Hall and meetings in church parlors in the Newsboy's Home, and in visiting jails, hospitals, printing offices and other places. It was while the temperance movement was confined to the object of "rescuing the perishing" the attention of Barnes and her co-workers was drawn to the necessity of not merely seeking to reform the fallen, but also of directing efforts to implant principles of total abstinence among young men and women, and enlisting their cooperation while they were yet young.

In 1878, in the national convention held in Baltimore, Barnes was made a member of the committee on young women's work, and in the next convention, held in Indianapolis, in 1879, she made a verbal report, and was at that time made chairman of the committee for the following year, and at its expiration, made the first report on young women's work, which appeared in the National Minutes. In 1879 and 1880, twenty Young WCTUs were organised in the State of New York, and of the twenty-five unions in Illinois, with a membership of 700, two-thirds had been formed during the year. In 1880, young women's work was made a department of the National WCTU, and Barnes was appointed General Secretary.

In 1890, she was appointed fraternal delegate to the annual meeting of the British Women's Temperance Association (BWTA), held in London, 21 and 22 May, at which time she so acceptably-presented the subject that the department of young women's work was immediately organized, and Lady Henry Somerset accepted the superintendency. As an outgrowth of that interest, sixteen branches were organised in Great Britain the first year. In 1891, Barnes was made the superintendent for the World's Young WCTU work. Under her care, it so grew that there was a membership of 30,000 in the United Suites alone. The members distributed literature, formed hygienic and physical culture clubs, had courses of reading, flower missions, loan-libraries, jail visiting, Sunday-school work, in all covering forty different departments of philanthropic and religious labor. During the year, she traveled extensively through the country, delivering addresses at public and parlor meetings and organizing new local unions. She spent several months traveling in Great Britain and on the continent, and in 1893, again went to England where she was the guest of Lady Henry Somerset at Reigate for some weeks.

In 1895, she made a trip to the Mediterranean and the Orient as chaperon to a party of five young ladies, and spoke on temperance in the many countries visited.

Not only was her voice heard in the cause of temperance, but she also was a writer. Barnes edited a manual on young women's temperance work and was a regular contributor both of prose and poetry to the Oak and Ivy Leaf, the organ of the National Young WCTU.

She served as president of the Loyal Legion Temperance Society of New York City for ten years, under whose care a free reading-room for working boys was maintained during that length of time, the attendance aggregating over 200,000 boys.

== Death ==
Barnes died on June 16, 1920.
