= Ernest L. Jahncke =

American politician and engineer (1877–1960)

Ernest Lee Jahncke
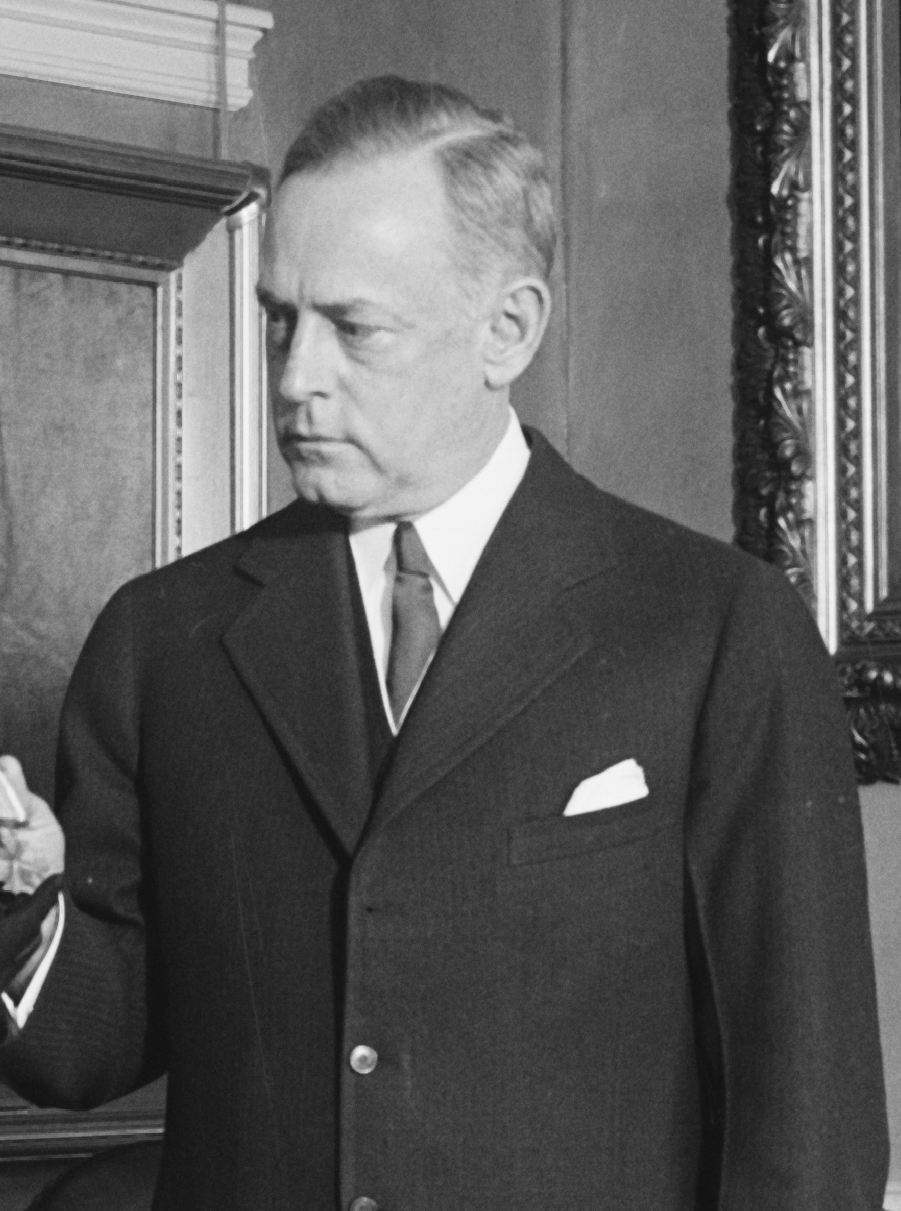
- Ernest Jahncke in 1930

16th Assistant Secretary of the Navy
- In office 1 April 1929 – 17 March 1933
- President: Herbert Hoover
- Preceded by: Theodore Douglas Robinson
- Succeeded by: Henry L. Roosevelt

Personal details
- Born: October 13, 1877 New Orleans, Louisiana
- Died: November 16, 1960 (aged 83) New Orleans, Louisiana
- Occupation: engineer

Ernest Lee Jahncke (October 13, 1877 – November 16, 1960) was United States Assistant Secretary of the Navy from 1929 to 1933. He was the first, and until the 2002 Winter Olympic bid scandal, the only person ever to have been expelled from the International Olympic Committee. He was removed in July 1936 for his outspoken opposition to holding the 1936 Summer Olympics in Nazi Germany.

== Biography ==
Ernest Lee Jahncke was born in New Orleans on 13 October 1877. His father was shipbuilder Frederick Jahncke and his mother was Margaret (Lee) Jahncke. He was married to Cora Van Voorhis Stanton (granddaughter of Edwin M. Stanton).

Jahncke was educated as an engineer and then joined his father's firm, the Jahncke Shipbuilding Company. A member of the American Society of Civil Engineers, he was the engineer who built the seawall in New Orleans running from the West End to the Spanish Fort.

In 1929, U.S. President Herbert Hoover appointed Jahncke as Assistant Secretary of the Navy, a position which Jahncke filled from 1 April 1929 to 17 March 1933. Jahncke served as a delegate at the 1932 Republican National Convention, which re-nominated President Hoover, and as an alternate to the 1936 Republican National Convention, which nominated Alfred M. Landon.

Ernest Jahncke did not serve in the Louisiana House of Representatives, but another Jahncke, Walter F. Jahncke, his younger brother, served in the state house from Orleans Parish as a Democrat for two terms from 1908 to 1916.

As member of the International Olympic Committee, Jahncke opposed holding the 1936 Winter Olympics and the 1936 Summer Olympics in Nazi Germany (the Games had been awarded to the Weimar Republic in 1931, but that German government had been replaced by Adolf Hitler's Third Reich starting in 1933). In a 25 November 1935 letter to IOC president Henri de Baillet-Latour, Jahncke wrote: "Neither Americans nor the representatives of other countries can take part in the Games in Nazi Germany without at least acquiescing in the contempt of the Nazis for fair play and their sordid exploitation of the Games." In July 1936, Jahncke was expelled from the IOC for his outspoken opposition to holding the Olympics in Germany. He was succeeded as IOC member by Avery Brundage.

Jahncke died on 16 November 1960.

Government offices
Preceded by Theodore Douglas Robinson	Assistant Secretary of the Navy; April 1, 1929 – March 17, 1933	Succeeded by Henry L. Roosevelt
