= Charles P. Clinch =

American government official and author

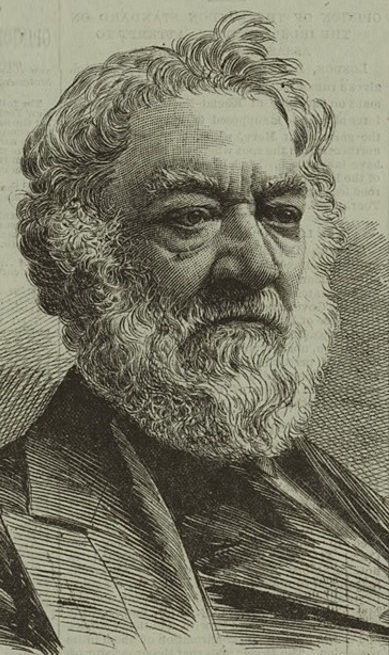
- 1880 newspaper illustration based on photo by Napoleon Sarony

Collector of the Port of New York (Acting)
- In office November 13th, 1865 – May 16th, 1866
- President: Andrew Johnson
- Preceded by: Preston King
- Succeeded by: Henry A. Smythe

Member of the New York State Assembly from New York County
- In office January 1, 1837 – December 31, 1837 Serving with Henry Andrew, Francis B. Cutting, Morris Franklin, Thomas Herttell, John I. Labagh, Clinton Roosevelt, Thomas G. Talmage, Robert Townsend Jr., Thomas W. Tucker, James I. M. Valentine, Anson Willis, George Zabriskie
- Preceded by: Charles P. Clinch, Ezra S. Conner, Peter A. Cowdrey, Francis B. Cutting, Thomas Herttell, John J. Morgan, Benjamin Ringgold, George Seaman, George Sharp, Jesse West, Prosper M. Wetmore
- Succeeded by: Alfred Carhart, Adoniram Chandler, Heman W. Childs, Evan Griffith, Willis Hall, William Harsell, John I. Labagh, David B. Ogden, Samuel B. Ruggles, John B. Scoles, Garret H. Stryker, Anson Willis, George Zabriskie
- In office January 1, 1836 – December 31, 1836 Serving with Ezra S. Conner, Peter A. Cowdrey, Francis B. Cutting, Thomas Herttell, John J. Morgan, Benjamin Ringgold, George Seaman, George Sharp, Jesse West, Prosper M. Wetmore
- Preceded by: Thomas N. Carr, Charles Henry Hall, Job Haskell, Thomas Herttell, Herman I. Quackenboss, Christopher C. Rice, Benjamin Ringgold, James I. Roosevelt, Prosper M. Wetmore, Andrew C. Wheeler
- Succeeded by: Henry Andrew, Charles P. Clinch, Francis B. Cutting, Morris Franklin, Thomas Herttell, John I. Labagh, Clinton Roosevelt, Thomas G. Talmage, Robert Townsend Jr., Thomas W. Tucker, James I. M. Valentine, Anson Willis, George Zabriskie
- In office January 1, 1835 – December 31, 1835 Serving with Thomas N. Carr, Charles Henry Hall, Job Haskell, Thomas Herttell, Herman I. Quackenboss, Christopher C. Rice, Benjamin Ringgold, James I. Roosevelt, Prosper M. Wetmore, Andrew C. Wheeler
- Preceded by: Abraham Cargill, John W. Degrauw, Daniel Dusenbury, Thomas Herttell, Henry Hone, John McKeon, Robert H. Morris, Mordecai Myers, Benjamin Ringgold, Peter S. Titus, Minthorne Tompkins
- Succeeded by: Charles P. Clinch, Ezra S. Conner, Peter A. Cowdrey, Francis B. Cutting, Thomas Herttell, John J. Morgan, Benjamin Ringgold, George Seaman, George Sharp, Jesse West, Prosper M. Wetmore

Personal details
- Born: October 20, 1797 New York City, New York, U.S.
- Died: December 16, 1880 (aged 83) New York City, New York, U.S.
- Resting place: Moravian Cemetery, Staten Island, New York
- Party: Democratic
- Relations: Alexander Turney Stewart (brother in law)
- Occupation: Government official Playwright

Charles Powell Clinch (October 20, 1797 – December 16, 1880) was an American playwright and public official. A longtime appointed official at the U.S. Custom House in New York City, he was most notable for his service as acting Collector of the Port of New York from 1865 to 1866.

== Early life ==
Charles Powell Clinch was born in New York City on October 20, 1797, a son of prominent ship chandler James Clinch and his first wife Susannah (Banker) Clinch. Among Clinch's siblings was Cornelia, the wife of Alexander Turney Stewart. Clinch was educated in the schools of New York City and worked briefly as a private secretary to Henry Eckford, a clerk at City Bank of New York and an editor at the Aurora newspaper. In his early life, Clinch was left independently wealthy by the death of his father. Much of his wealth was in insurance company stock, and he lost most of it as the result of higher than usual claims caused by 1835's Great Fire of New York, which caused several insurers to fail.

== Career ==
A Democrat in politics, Clinch served in the New York State Assembly From 1835 to 1836, the 58th, 59th, and 60th Legislatures. In addition, he was active in the Tammany Hall organization and served as a sachem.

Because of his reduced financial circumstances, in 1838 Clinch obtained an appointment as an inspector in the New York Custom House, and he remained a customs official for the next thirty-eight years, regardless of the collector's party affiliation. In 1839 he was appointed one of the custom house's deputy collectors, a position in which he remained until 1857. Clinch provided continuity between collectors, who were political appointees, and became renowned for his knowledge of customs laws and regulations. In 1857, he was appointed a special deputy, empowered to act for the collector in the collector's absence, and he remained in this position until 1863.

In 1863, Collector Hiram Barney appointed Clinch as assistant collector, the collector's chief deputy, and a position which was not filled before or after Clinch's appointment. He remained in this position until retiring in November 1876. Clinch served as acting collector from November 13, 1865, to May 16, 1866, between the suicide of Preston King and appointment of Henry A. Smythe. He resisted the efforts of John Van Buren and other supporters to obtain the collector's position for him, arguing that he did want to lose his independence by becoming a political appointee. A pro-Union Democrat during the American Civil War, when news of Robert E. Lee's surrender reached New York, Clinch informed his staff by marching into the custom house rotunda with an American flag and singing every verse to The Star-Spangled Banner.

Clinch was a poet and author and maintained a wide circle of literary and artistic friends, including James Gordon Bennett Sr., Thurlow Weed, Fitz-Greene Halleck, and Emma Stebbins. Among his published works were the plays were The Spy, The Avengers Vow, The Expelled Collegians, and The First of May in New York.

== Family ==
Clinch was married to Abigail (Abby) Mary Allen (1782-1770). She was the mother of a daughter, Annie (d. 1890), whom Clinch adopted. His sister was Cornelia Mitchell Clinch, who married Alexander Turney Stewart.

== Death and burial ==
Clinch died in New York City on December 16, 1880. He was buried at Moravian Cemetery on Staten Island.
