= Nicholas Roosevelt (inventor) =

American inventor (1767–1854)

Nicholas James Roosevelt
- Born: Nicholas James Roosevelt; December 27, 1767; New York City, Province of New York
- Died: July 30, 1854 (aged 86); Skaneateles, New York
- Occupation: Inventor
- Known for: Steamboat vertical paddle wheel
- Spouse: Lydia Sellon Latrobe (m. 1808)
- Children: Rosetta Mark Roosevelt; Henry Latrobe Roosevelt; Samuel Roosevelt; Lydia Eliza Roosevelt
- Parent(s): Jacobus Roosevelt; Annatje Bogart
- Relatives: See Roosevelt family

Nicholas Jacobus Roosevelt or Nicholas James Roosevelt (December 27, 1767, New York City – July 30, 1854, Skaneateles, New York) was an American inventor, a major investor in Upstate New York land, and a member of the Roosevelt family. His primary invention was to introduce vertical paddle wheels for steamboats.

== Early life ==
Nicholas Roosevelt was born on December 27, 1767, in New York City. He was the son of Jacobus Roosevelt (1724–1777) and Annatje (née Bogart) (b. 1728), who wed on December 2, 1746. His siblings were: Anna (1748–1794) who married Andrew Heermanse, John (b. 1755), Jacobus (1759–1840), Helena (1761–1843), and Maria Roosevelt (b. 1763).

After the death of his mother, his father remarried, on July 14, 1774, to Elenora Gibson, widow of Mr. Thompson. His paternal grandfather was Johannes Roosevelt (1689–1750), a son of Nicholas Roosevelt (1658–1742), himself a son of Dutch immigrant Claes Maartenszen Van Rosenvelt (d. 1659), who established the Roosevelt family in America.

=== Extended family ===
Through his brother, James Jacobus Roosevelt (1759–1840), he was the uncle of James John Roosevelt (1795–1875) and Cornelius Van Schaack Roosevelt, Sr. (1794–1871), progenitor of the Oyster Bay Roosevelts, and through him, a great-grand uncle of President Theodore Roosevelt. Other members of the Roosevelt family resided in the village of Skaneateles, including Frederick Roosevelt, cousin of the president.

His sister Maria Roosevelt married James Alexander Provoost, the brother of Bishop Samuel Provoost (1742–1815), and his niece through her, Mary Provoost, was married to the Scottish born artist Alexander Robertson (1772-1841), and had two children, Catherine Robertson and Andrew Robertson.

== Career ==
During the American Revolutionary War, Roosevelt lived in Esopus as New York City was evacuated and occupied by the British. After the War's end, Roosevelt returned to New York. While in Esopus, he had made a small wooden boat, across which was an axle projecting over the sides with paddles at the ends, made to revolve by a tight cord wound around its middle by the reaction of hickory and whalebone springs.

Back in New York City, he engaged in manufacturing, and became interested in the Schuyler Copper Mine in North Arlington, New Jersey, on the Passaic River. Using a model of Josiah Hornblower's atmospheric machine, he designed a similar one and built engines for constructed for the water works of Philadelphia.

=== Government commissions ===
Around the same time, he was contracted to erect rolling works and supply the government with copper drawn and rolled for six 74-gun ships. In 1797, with Robert R. Livingston and John Stevens, he agreed to build a boat on joint account, for which the engines were to be constructed by Roosevelt, and the propelling agency was to be that planned by Livingston. The experiment failed, the speed attained being only equivalent to about 3 miles per hour (4.8 km/h) in still water.

On September 6, 1798, Roosevelt described and earnestly recommended to Livingston a vertical wheel, which is the first practical suggestion of the combination that made steam navigation a commercial success, although four years later Robert Fulton believed that chains and floats were alone to be relied on. Livingston, however, had replied to Roosevelt's proposition on October 28, 1798, saying that "vertical wheels are out of the question." But in the spring of 1802, Livingston having communicated Roosevelt's plan to Fulton, they adopted the former's view, and in January of the next year, they launched a boat that was propelled by Roosevelt's vertical wheels.

During this period, Roosevelt suffered financially, as the government failed to fulfill its contract with him, and he was unable to put his plans in operation.

=== Partnership with Fulton ===
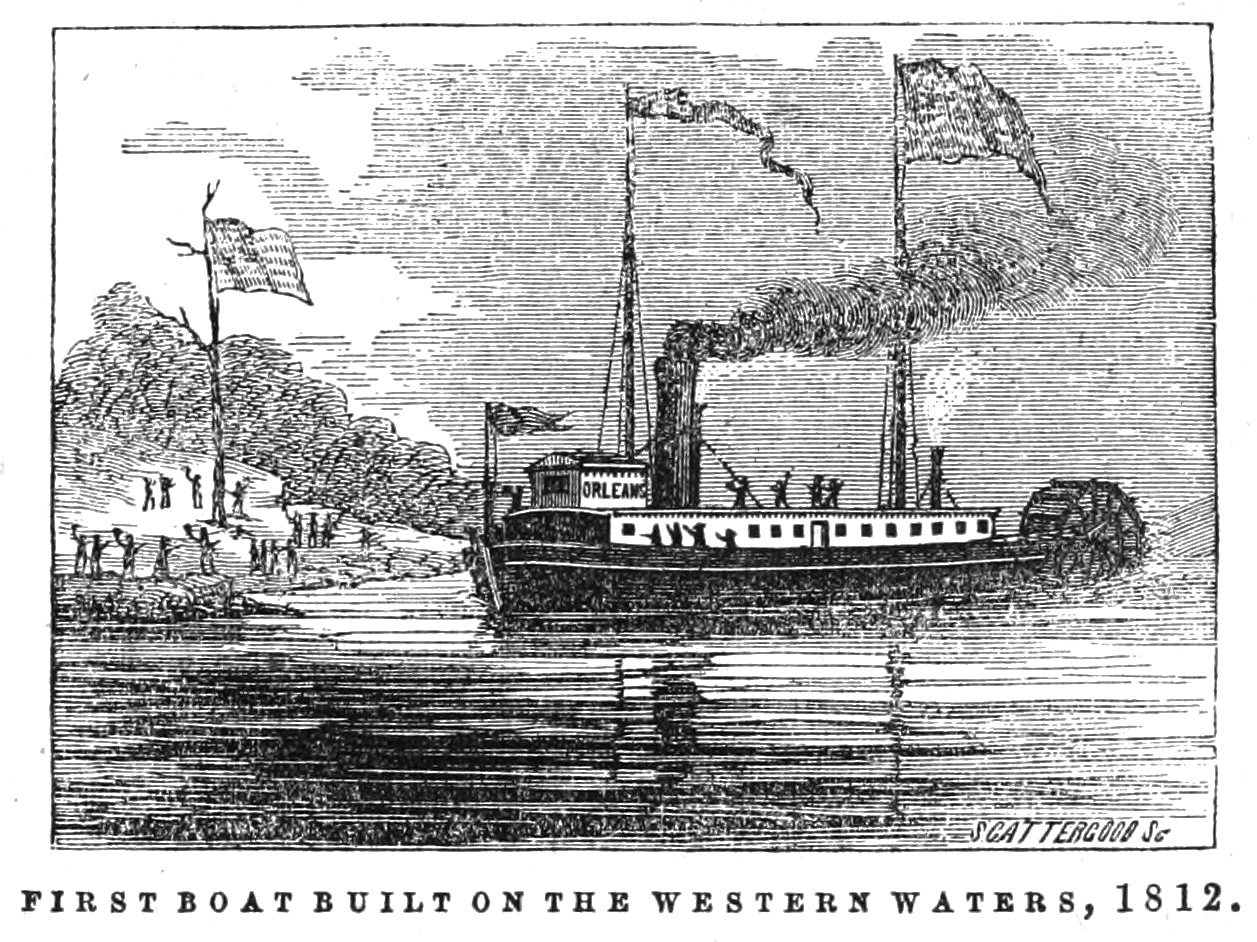
First steamboat on the Western Waters, built (1811) by Nicholas Roosevelt; engraving (1856) by David Scattergood

In 1809, he associated himself with Fulton in the introduction of steamboats on the western waters, and in 1811, he built and navigated the "New Orleans," the pioneer boat that descended the Ohio and Mississippi rivers from Pittsburgh to New Orleans in 14 days. He had previously descended both rivers in a flatboat to obtain information.

=== Patent fight ===
In January 1815, Roosevelt applied to the New Jersey Legislature for protection as the inventor of vertical wheels, he had already obtained a patent from the United States in December 1814. The legislature, after discussion, decided that "it was inexpedient to make any special provision in connection with the matter in controversy before the body," and there the matter rested. Roosevelt's papers came into the possession of Richard S. Cox, his executor, from whom they were obtained in 1828, and from these, with others from the papers of Chancellor Livingston, a case was prepared and submitted to Roger B. Taney, which had been already submitted to William Wirt, and, both opinions being favorable, a suit was about to be begun when the consideration of the great expense involved in its prosecution caused the whole matter to be abandoned.

Roosevelt had by this time retired from active life, residing with his family at Skaneateles. In the case submitted for Wirt's opinion, it is said that Fulton never made oath to the application for a patent for vertical wheels over the sides; and that the application itself was signed by another person — a statement that would seem to be corroborated to a great extent by Fulton's own account of his invention in an interview with Benjamin H. Latrobe on February 7, 1809, when the latter was endeavoring to bring about what subsequently took place — a connection between Fulton and Roosevelt in regard to the introduction of steamboats on the western waters. "I have no pretensions," said Fulton, "to be the first inventor of the steamboat. Hundreds of others have tried it and failed. Neither do I pretend to the right to navigate steamboats, except in New York... That to which I claim an exclusive right is the so proportioning the boat to the power of the engine and the velocity with which the wheels of the boat, or both, move with the maximum velocity attainable by the power, and the construction of the whole machine." In the same conversation Mr. Fulton said: "As to Mr. Roosevelt, I regard him as a noble-minded, intelligent man, and would do anything to serve him that I could."

=== Land speculator ===
He and his brother John sold a large tract of land in Oswego County, New York, to George Scriba in 1793 which is now the town of Scriba.

== Personal life ==
Nicholas Roosevelt married Lydia Sellon Latrobe (1791–1878), daughter of his best friend and business partner, Benjamin Henry Latrobe (1764–1820), a prominent architect. Lydia was thirteen years old when Nicholas began courting her. They married when she was seventeen and he was forty-one years old. Together, they were the parents of:

- Rosetta Mark Rosevelt (1809–1840), who married Russell Fitch (1805–1865)
- Henry Latrobe Roosevelt (1811–1884), born aboard the New Orleans, on its maiden voyage, who did not marry.
- Samuel Roosevelt (1813–1878), who married Mary Jane Horton (1823–1901)
- Lydia Eliza Roosevelt (1819–1852), who married Montgomery Schuyler (1814–1896), uncle of Montgomery Schuyler (1843–1914).

Nicholas Roosevelt died at Skaneateles, New York, where he had a home, built in 1831 and extant at 101 East Genesee Street. He was survived by his wife, who died in 1878.

=== Descendants ===
His grandchildren included: James Roosevelt Fitch (1840–1878), Montgomery Roosevelt Schuyler (1845–1924), who married Leila Roosevelt, Samuel Montgomery Roosevelt (1858–1920), a noted portrait painter, and Nicholas Latrobe Roosevelt (1847–1892), the father of Henry Latrobe Roosevelt (1879–1936), the Assistant Secretary of the Navy.
