= Skaneateles Historic District =

Historic district in New York, United States

- U.S. National Register of Historic Places
- U.S. Historic district
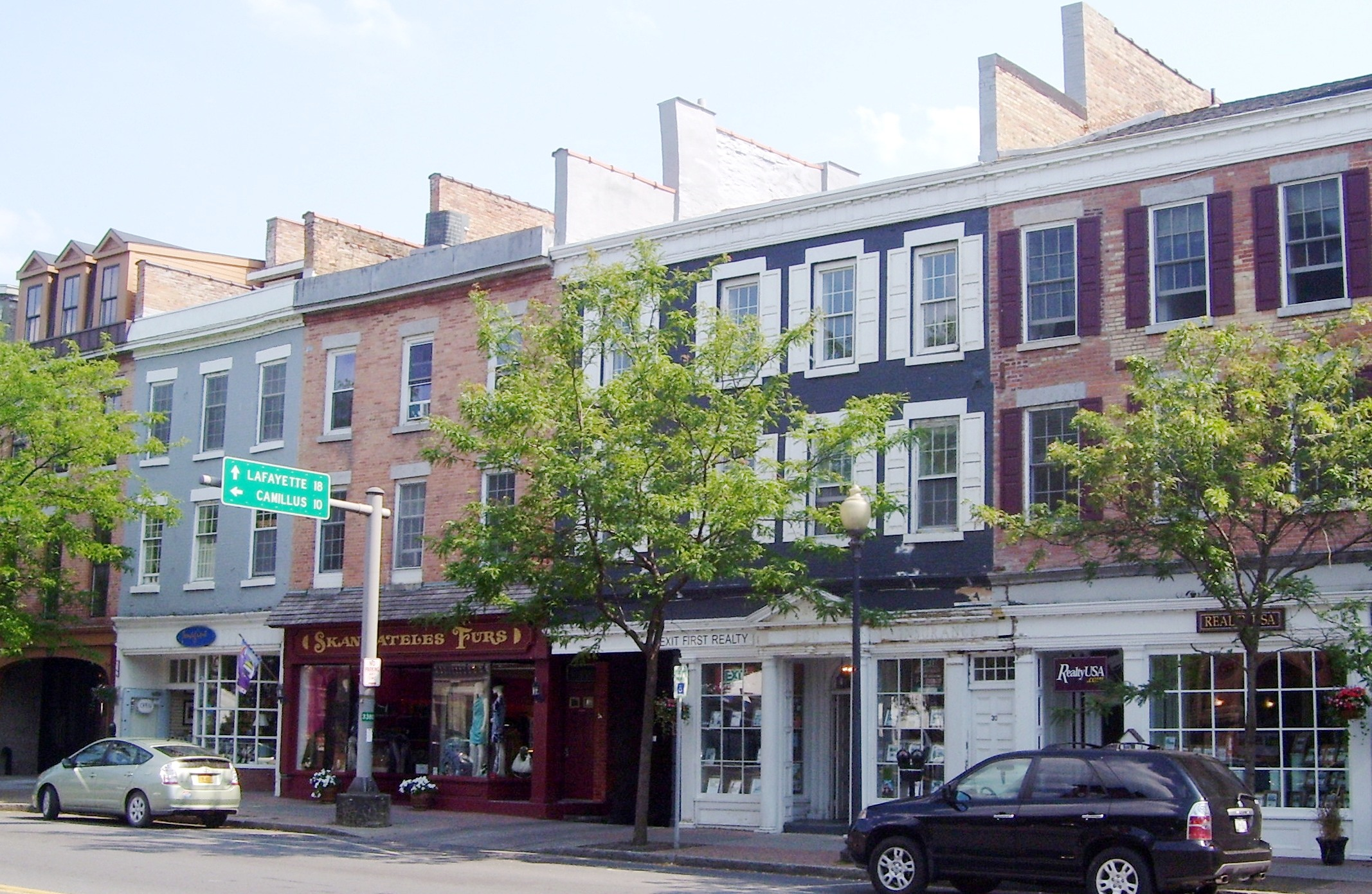
- Commercial row buildings from 28 - 42 East Genesee Street (2012)

- Location within New York Location within the United States
- Location: East Genesee St., Jordan and Fennell Sts. Skaneateles, New York
- Coordinates: 42°57′14″N 76°25′36″W
- Area: 17 acres (6.9 ha)
- Built: 1796-1928
- Architect: various
- Architectural style: various
- NRHP reference No.: 84002818
- Added to NRHP: May 10, 1984

The Skaneateles Historic District is a 17 acres (6.9 ha) historic district in the village of Skaneateles, New York, that dates back to 1796, includes one building from the 20th century, but is otherwise composed of 19th-century residences and commercial buildings. It includes 59 contributing buildings and one contributing site – Thayer Park along Skaneateles Lake, – as well as five non-contributing structures. The district runs along both sides of East Genesee Street (New York Route 20) from Jordan Street to Onondaga Street (County Route 41), and includes the core of Skaneateles' historic downtown area, which was rebuilt in 1836 after being almost totally destroyed by fire in 1835. Also included are properties on Jordan Street up to the intersection of Fennell Street, and the stone mill property on Fennell Street.

Architects whose work is represented in the district include Stanford White ("The Boulders", 100 East Genesee Street, 1881) and Horatio Nelson White (St. James' Episcopal Church, 94 East Genesee Street, 1873). The Greek Revival, Federal, Italianate and Romanesque Revival styles are represented within the district, which is "an intact, cohesive collection of commercial and residential buildings located on a picturesque, tree-lined street...."

The district was added to the National Register of Historic Places in 1984.

== Gallery ==
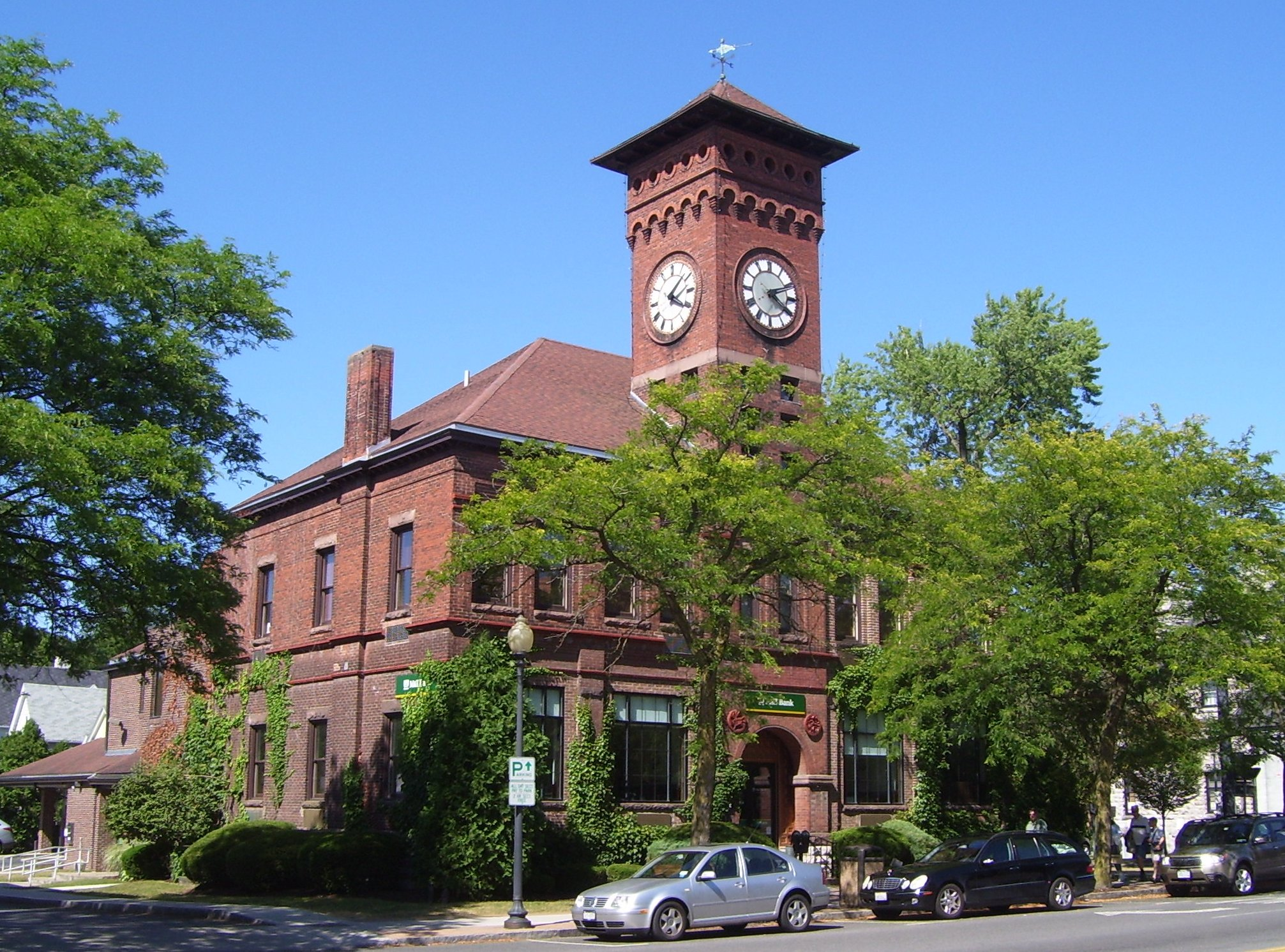
Bank building, 33 East Genesee
(1888; tower added 1895)

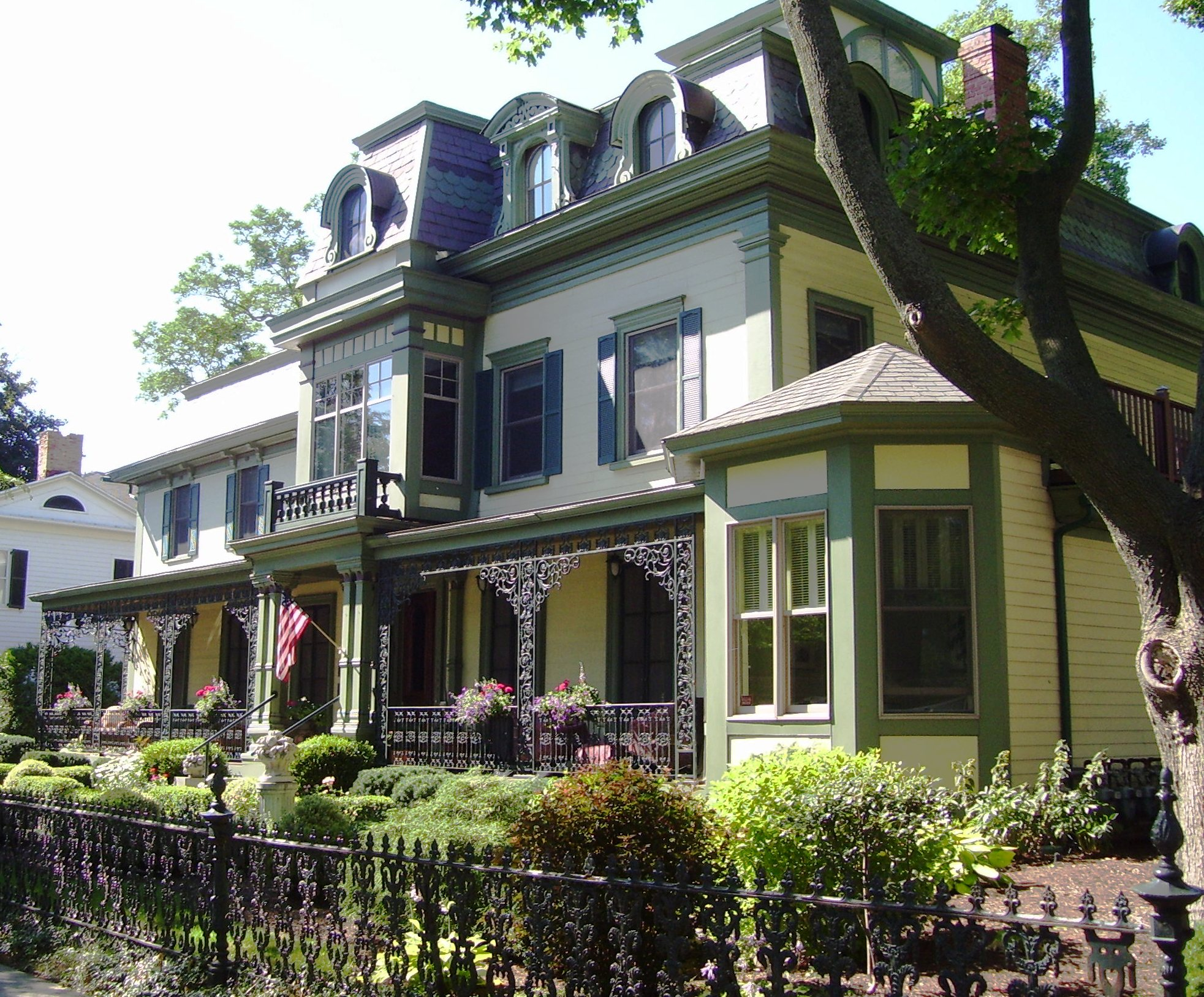
Thayer House
(1806; remodeled 1862)

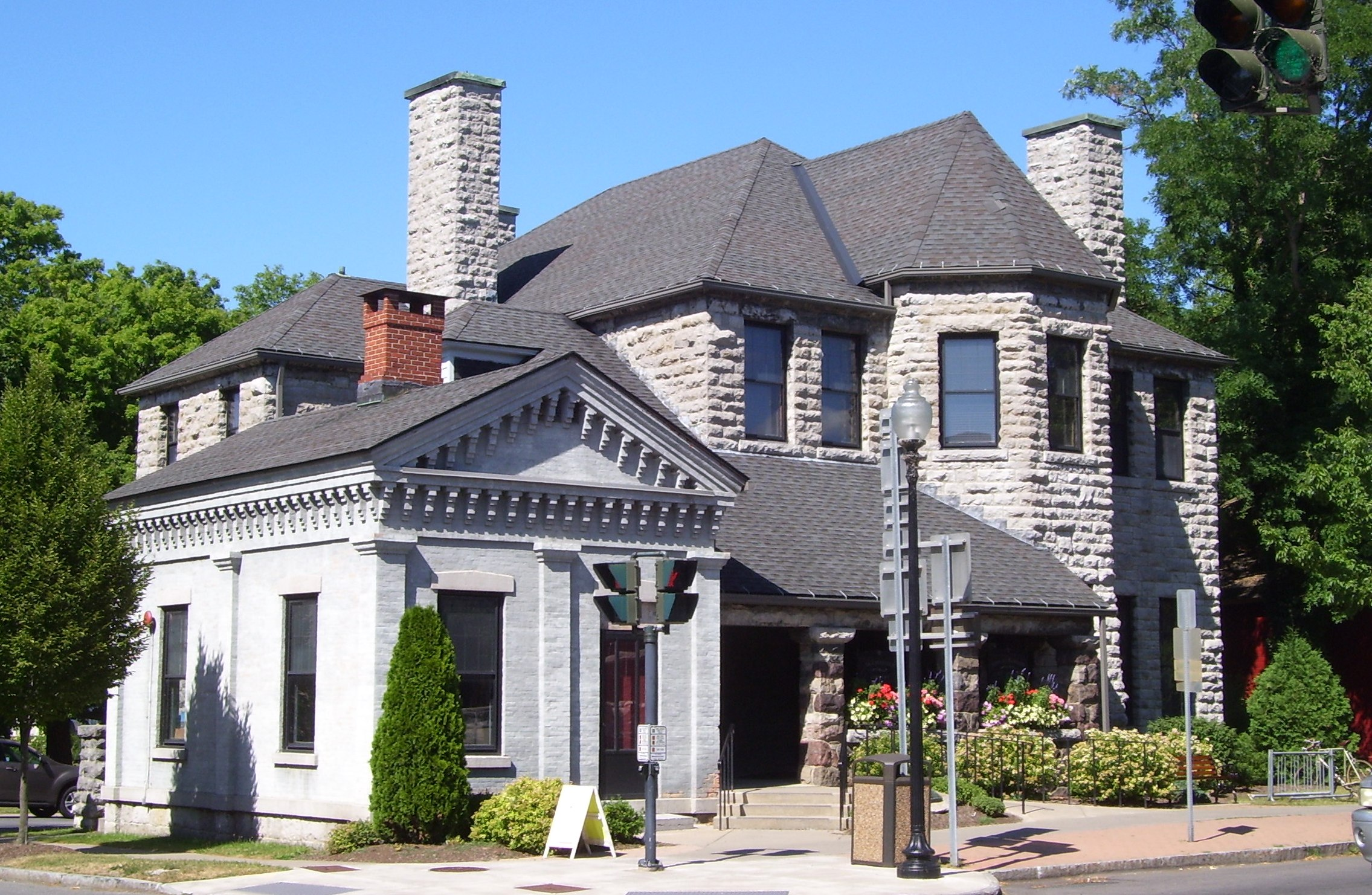
Skaneateles Library and John D. Barrow Art Gallery (1886–87)

== See also ==
- National Register of Historic Places listings in Onondaga County, New York
