= Henry L. Roosevelt =

American government officeholder

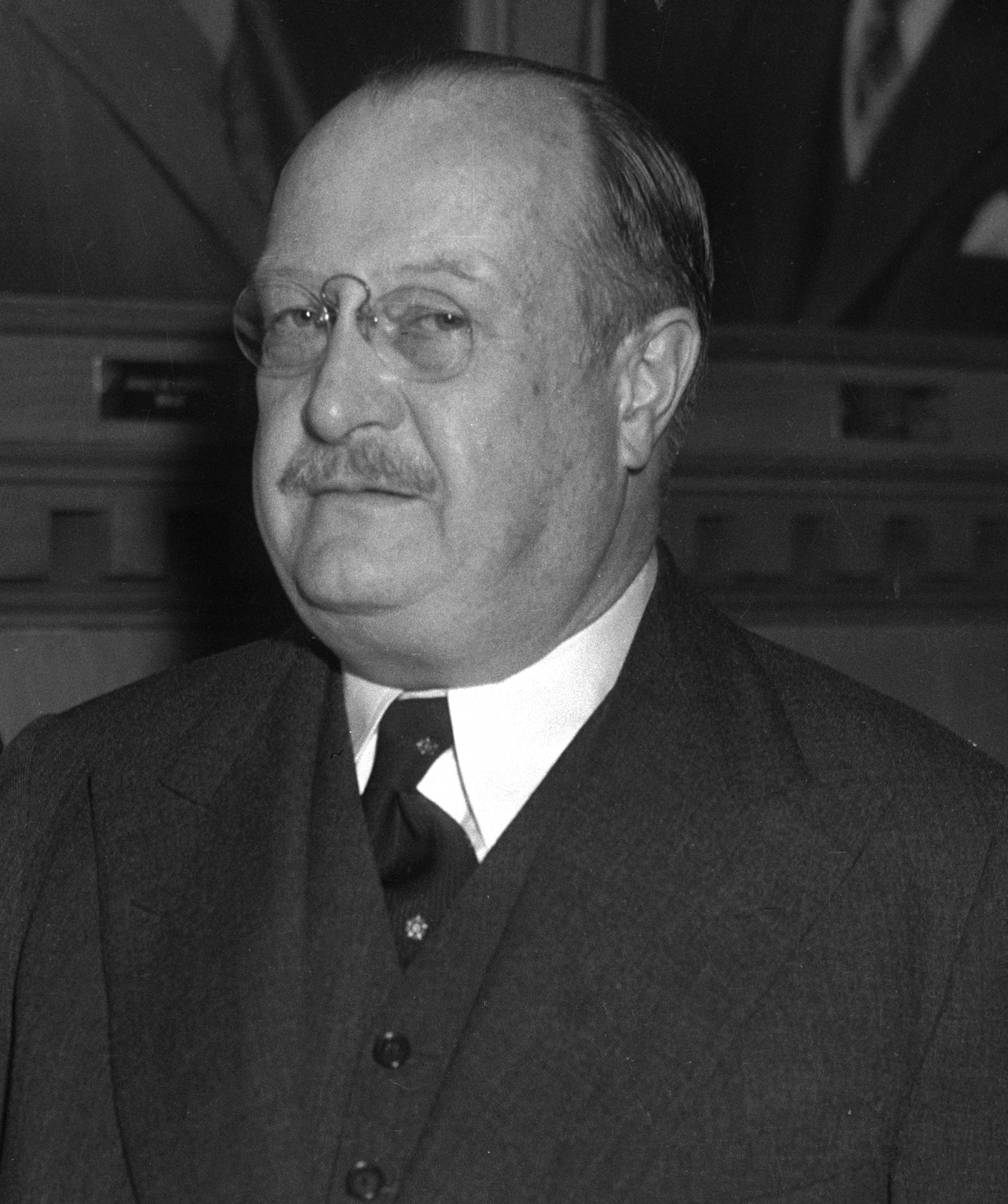
- Roosevelt in 1935

17th Assistant Secretary of the Navy
- In office March 17, 1933 – February 22, 1936
- President: Franklin D. Roosevelt
- Preceded by: Ernest L. Jahncke
- Succeeded by: Charles Edison

Personal details
- Born: Henry Latrobe Roosevelt; October 5, 1879 Morristown, New Jersey, U.S.
- Died: February 22, 1936 (aged 56) Bethesda, Maryland, U.S.
- Spouse: Eleanor Morrow (m. 1902)
- Relations: See Roosevelt family
- Children: 3
- Parent(s): Nicholas Latrobe Roosevelt; Eleanor Dean
- Education: United States Naval Academy

Military service
- Allegiance: United States
- Branch/service: United States Marine Corps
- Years of service: 1899–1920
- Rank: Lieutenant colonel

Henry Latrobe Roosevelt (October 5, 1879 – February 22, 1936) was an assistant secretary of the United States Navy and a member of the Roosevelt family.

== Early life ==
Roosevelt was born on October 5, 1879, in Morristown, New Jersey, to Lieutenant Nicholas Latrobe Roosevelt (1847–1892), USN, who had a naval career of distinction, and Eleanor (née Dean) Roosevelt (1852–1933).

His father was a grandson of Nicholas Roosevelt (1767–1854), an inventor and land-owner.

He was a hereditary companion of the California Commandery of the Military Order of the Loyal Legion of the United States in succession to his father. In 1896, he entered the United States Naval Academy and graduated in 1900.

== Career ==
On December 8, 1899, Roosevelt was commissioned a second lieutenant in the United States Marine Corps and he rose to the rank of lieutenant colonel before retiring. During his career with the Marine Corps he was stationed in, among other places, Philadelphia, Panama, Cuba and Haiti.

In 1920, he retired from the Marine Corps, and then served as the European manager for the Radio Corporation of America from 1923 to 1928, overseeing the building of large radio stations in Ankara, Turkey, and Warsaw, Poland.

In 1933, he returned to the United States to head the Radio Real Estate Corporation, but was soon selected by Secretary of the Navy Claude A. Swanson for the post of Assistant Secretary of the Navy in the administration of his distant cousin, President Franklin D. Roosevelt. He served in the position from March 17, 1933, until his death on February 22, 1936. He became the fourth Roosevelt and fifth member of the Roosevelt family to occupy that office, after Theodore Roosevelt, Franklin D. Roosevelt (the president under whom he served in the post), Theodore Roosevelt Jr. and Theodore Douglas Robinson. Due to Swanson's poor health, Roosevelt was at times Acting Secretary. He made many tours of inspection and speeches, calling for the strengthening of the navy as a deterrent to war.

== Personal life ==
In 1902, he married Eleanor Morrow (1879–1958), daughter of William W. Morrow (1843–1929), a California Circuit Judge and member of the U.S. House of Representatives from California's 4th congressional district.

- William Morrow Roosevelt (1906–1983), who married Louise Gilpin Morris (1910–1977), daughter of Israel Wister Morris, in 1932.
- Henry Latrobe Roosevelt Jr. (1910–1985), who married Vera Felicity Story, daughter of Julian Russell Story, a noted painter, and granddaughter of William Wetmore Story, a noted sculptor, in 1937.
- Eleanor Katherine Roosevelt (1915–1995), who married Reverdy Wadsworth (1914–1970), son of U.S. Senator and Representative James W. Wadsworth Jr.

Roosevelt died on February 22, 1936, at Bethesda Naval Hospital of a heart attack following intestinal influenza. He was buried at Arlington National Cemetery.

Government offices
Preceded by Ernest L. Jahncke	Assistant Secretary of the Navy; March 17, 1933 – February 22, 1936	Succeeded by Charles Edison
