= Skaneateles (village), New York =

Village in New York, United States

Skaneateles, New York
- Village
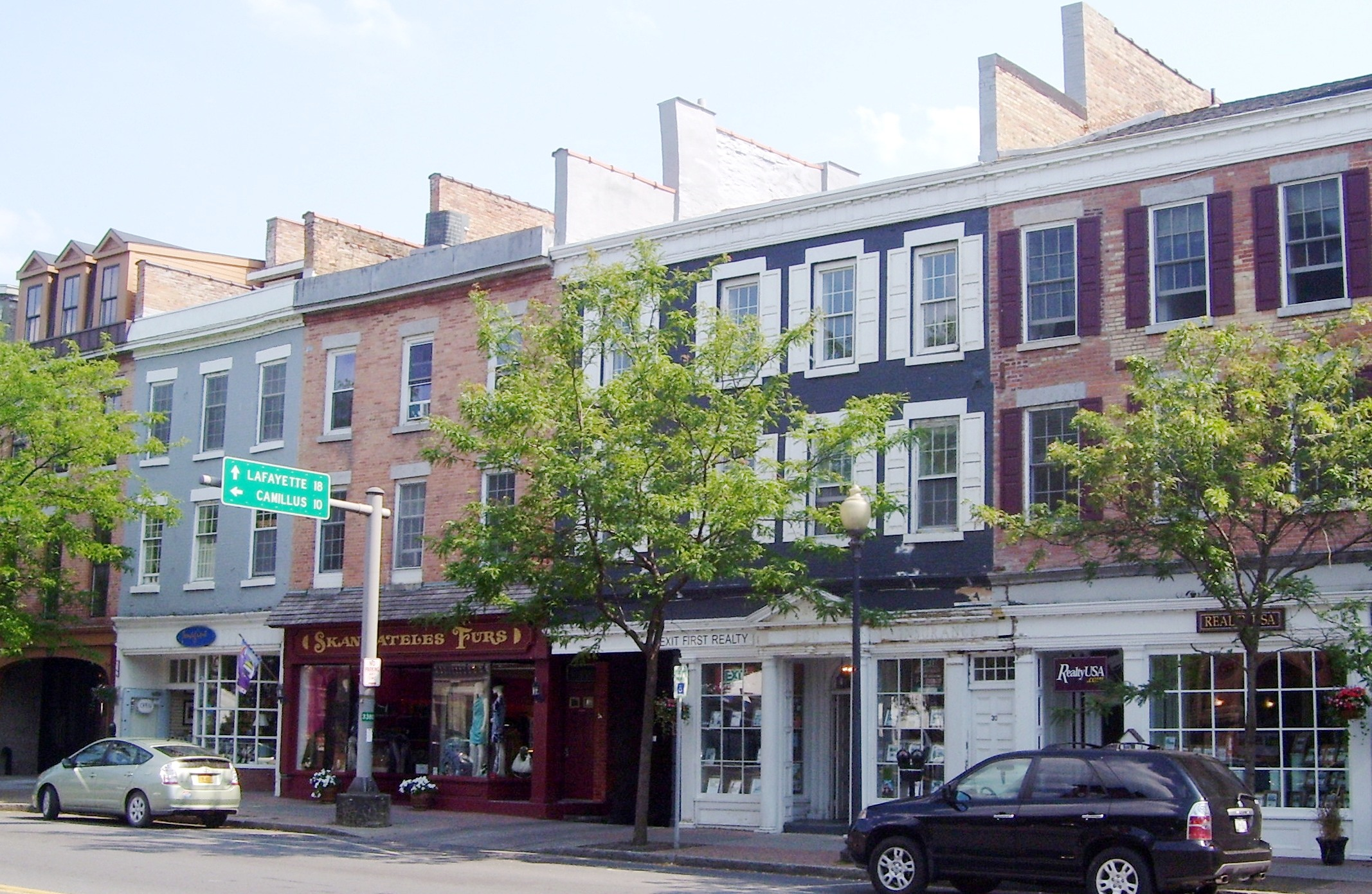
- Shops on East Genesee Street, part of the Skaneateles Historic District (2012)

- Emblem

- Skaneateles village's location in Onondaga County and the county's location in the state of New York, both highlighted in red; other incorporated areas of the county highlighted in gray
- Coordinates: 42°56′48″N 76°25′42″W
- Country: United States
- State: New York
- County: Onondaga
- Town: Skaneateles
- Incorporated: 1833

Government
  - Mayor: Mary Sennett
  - Trustees: Tyde Richards; Kathleen Zapata; Ed Evans; Tara Lynn

Area
  - Total: 1.74 sq mi (4.51 km^{2})
  - Land: 1.42 sq mi (3.69 km^{2})
  - Water: 0.32 sq mi (0.83 km^{2}) 16.28%

Population (2020)
  - Total: 2,533
  - Density: 1,779.8/sq mi (687.18/km^{2})
- ZIP Code: 13152
- Area code: 315
- FIPS code: 36-67510
- Website: villageofskaneateles.gov

Skaneateles (/ˌskæniˈætləs/ SKAN-ee-AT-ləs, locally /ˌskɪn-/ SKIN-) is an affluent village in the town of Skaneateles, in Onondaga County, New York, United States. The village is named after, and located on the shores of, Skaneateles Lake, one of the Finger Lakes. As of the 2020 census, the village had a population of 2,533 residents.

== History ==
Following the Revolutionary War, settlers rapidly populated the eastern Finger Lakes region in the 1790s. Water power from the outlet of Skaneateles Lake made the site of the present village attractive for settlement. Although it had been thought that the first permanent white settler in the area was John Thompson, further research has shown that Abraham A. Cuddeback from Minisink, New York was the first to arrive in 1794.

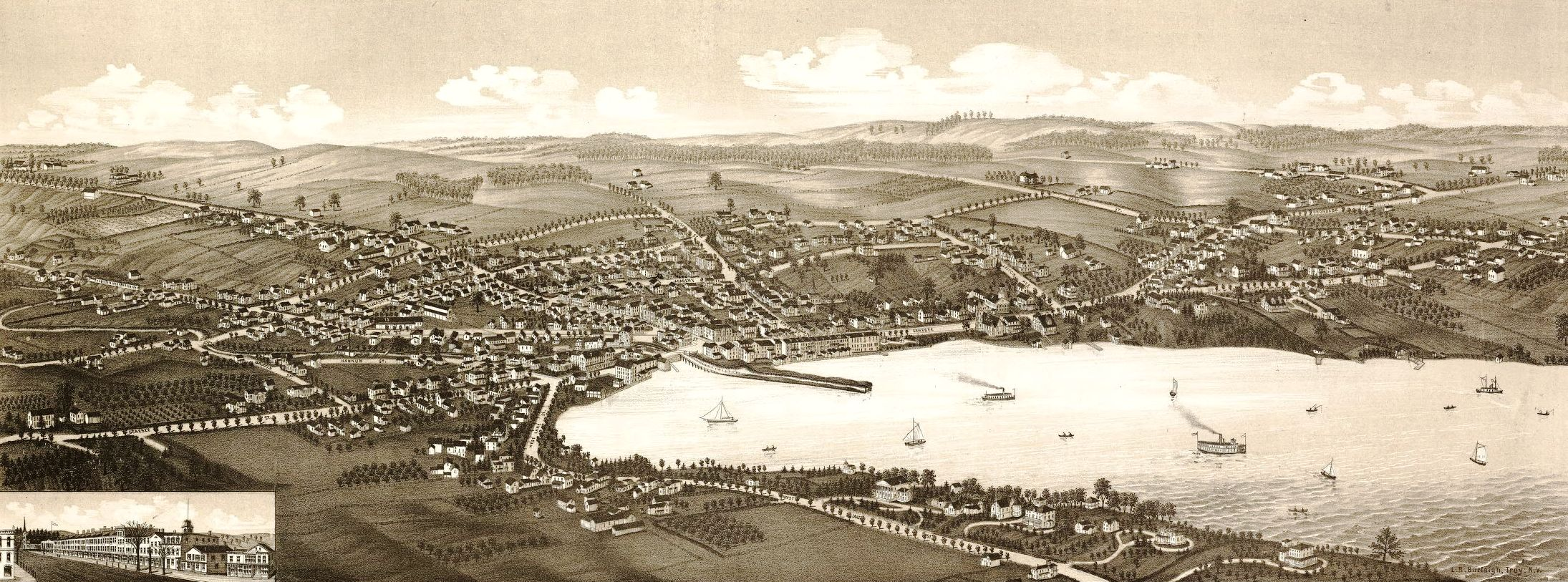
Map of the village in 1884

The old Genesee Road, which connected Utica, Marcellus, Auburn, Geneva and Avon became the Seneca Turnpike in 1800; the first bridge across Skaneateles Creek was built that year. The Seneca Turnpike, together with the Hamilton and Skaneateles Turnpike which opened in 1826, made the new community more accessible. Isaac Sherwood, founder of the Sherwood Inn, developed a stagecoach line through Skaneateles.

The village, which incorporated in 1833 and 1855, attracted prominent residents from an early date. In 1803, a major New York State landowner from New York City, William J. Vredenburgh, erected a sizable mansion. In 1839, Nicholas Roosevelt, "one of the leading industrial entrepreneurs of the period [who] had built the big steam engines for the Philadelphia waterwork," also from New York City, retired to Skaneateles with his wife, Lydia Latrobe – daughter of the noted architect Benjamin Henry Latrobe.

In the same year, Richard DeZeng, an engineer and canal builder, retired from Oswego, New York to a mansion on the lake. Another Roosevelt family member, Samuel Montgomery Roosevelt, acquired DeZeng's Greek Revival house which later became known as Roosevelt Hall. It may be the work of Ithiel Town, the partner of Alexander Jackson Davis, who designed the house of Reuel Smith, a wealthy Massachusetts importer who retired to Skaneateles. Built in 1852, the architecturally distinguished house, designed in the Gothic Revival style, has been listed in the National Registry; its plans are in the Library of Congress.

Many early residents such as James Canning Fuller came from Great Britain, largely because of the Quaker community here, giving the early village a cosmopolitan tone. Fuller and his wife Lydia maintained an active Underground Railroad station at their village home (built 1815, extant at 98 Genesee Street.) Fuller was co-founder of the British-American Institute, a Canadian school for fugitive slaves, together with the adjoining settlement of Dawn near Dresden, Ontario.

For more than two centuries, Skaneateles has also attracted visitors and tourists. An excursion boat launched in 1816 was probably the first instance of commercial tourist recreation in the Finger Lakes region.

== Geography ==
The village is located at the north end of Skaneateles Lake at the eastern end of the Finger Lakes region. According to the United States Census Bureau, the village has a total area of 1.7 sq mi (4.4 km^{2}), of which 1.4 sq mi (3.6 km^{2}) is land and 0.3 sq mi (0.78 km^{2}) is water.

The main highway through the community is U.S. Route 20 (Genesee Street), which heads westward toward Auburn. US 20 and Skaneateles also serve as the northern terminus of NY Route 41 and its suffixed route NY Route 41A. The village is also the southern terminus of NY Route 321.

== Demographics ==
Historical population
Census	Pop.	Note	%±
1870	1,409		—
1880	1,669		18.5%
1890	1,559		−6.6%
1900	1,495		−4.1%
1910	1,615		8.0%
1920	1,635		1.2%
1930	1,882		15.1%
1940	1,949		3.6%
1950	2,331		19.6%
1960	2,921		25.3%
1970	3,055		4.6%
1980	2,789		−8.7%
1990	2,724		−2.3%
2000	2,616		−4.0%
2010	2,450		−6.3%
2020	2,533		3.4%
U.S. Decennial Census

As of the census of 2010, there were 2,450 people, 1,094 households, and 674 families residing in the village. The population density was 1,400 inhabitants per square mile (540/km^{2}). There were 1,190 housing units at an average density of 700/sq mi (270/km^{2}). The racial makeup of the village was 97.84% White, 0.12% Black or African American, 0.82% Asian, 0.08% from other races, and 1.02% from two or more races. Hispanic or Latino of any race were 1.14% of the population.

There were 1,094 households, out of which 27.1% had children under the age of 18 living with them, 60.4% were married couples living together, 7.3% had an unmarried female householder, and 28.9% were non-families. 25.3% of all households were made up of individuals, and 12.9% had someone living alone who was 65 years of age or older. The average household size was 2.44 and the average family size was 2.92.

In the village, the population was spread out, with 22.9% under the age of 18, 5.3% from 18 to 24, 16.8% from 25 to 44, 35.6% from 45 to 64, and 19.4% who were 65 years of age or older. The median age was 48.1 years. For every 100 females, there were 93.9 males. For every 100 females age 18 and over, there were 91.9 males.

The median household income in the village was $77,456, and the median family income was $117,788. In 2000, males had a median income of $64,524 versus $30,833 for females. The per capita income for the village was $49,957. About 3.31% of families and 6.20% of the population were below the poverty line, including 6.6% of those under age 18 and 3.8% of those age 65 or over. In 2006, 164 residential properties in the Town of Skaneateles were assessed at more than a million dollars, compared to only two such properties in all the rest of Onondaga County.

== Government ==
The Village of Skaneateles is governed by a five-person board consisting of the mayor and four trustees, each of whom is elected to a two-year term. On April 1, 2021, Mary Sennett succeeded Marty Hubbard as mayor, the first time a female has held this office in village history.

In the late 2000s, the village was involved in a controversy with the trucking industry which uses Route 20 through the village to reduce travel time and bypass tolls on the New York State Thruway. Most of the truck traffic hauls garbage from New York City to a landfill near Seneca Falls, New York. As of 2008, the state government was considering imposing restrictions on truck traffic. In November 2008, truckers staged a massive convoy through the Village during its popular holiday-time Dickens Festival.

The village lies within the town of Skaneateles, which has its own elected officials and staff. The Town and Village Joint Comprehensive Plan of 2005 examined consolidating the two entities into one government to reduce redundancies and create efficiencies. In 2009, the New York State Legislature passed legislation to ease such consolidations under the premise that they would create efficiencies and reduce tax burdens.

== Local attractions ==
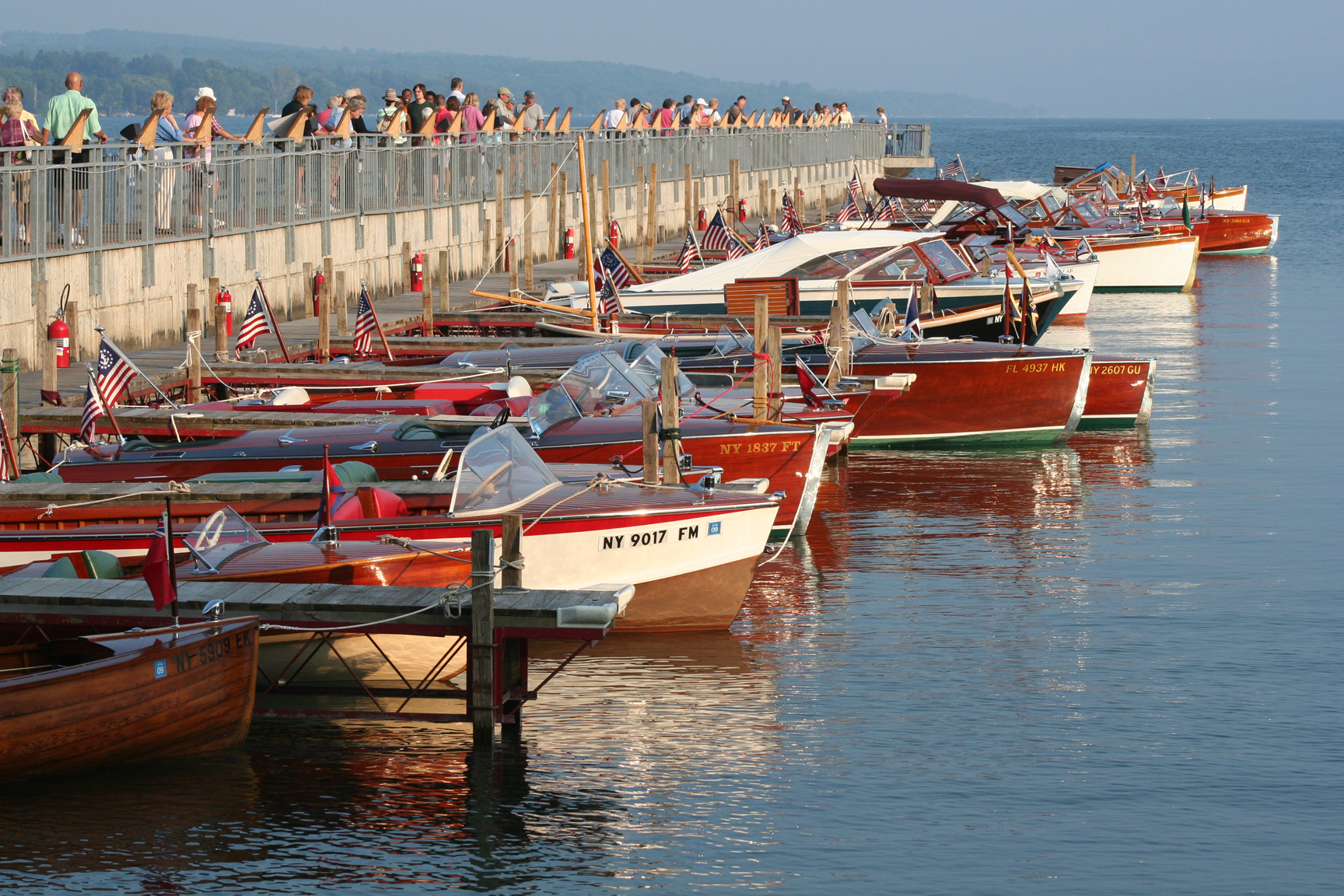
Boats on display in 2007 at the annual Antique and Classic Boat Show

The village consists of a small commercial core with surrounding residential streets; the downtown area sits immediately on the lake. There are three publicly accessible parks on the lake within the downtown area. The main commercial streets in the village are Genesee Street (U.S. Route 20), Jordan Road, and Fennell Street. Genesee and Jordan streets, the core of the Skaneateles Historic District, are noted for their mix of mid-19th and early 20th century retail buildings which today contain a mix of retailers, including restaurants, boutiques, real estate offices, and banks. Fennell Street, which has a more industrial history and was the alignment for the railroad spur that served the village until the mid-20th century, contains more of the village's car-oriented retail stores, including a supermarket, pharmacies, and post office.

Village attractions include boat excursions, inns, restaurants and a spa, as well as boutique shopping and art galleries. The summer Skaneateles Festival of music is a seasonal event, as is the annual Skaneateles Antique and Classic Boat Show and the Dickens Christmas in Skaneateles with actors in period costume performing on the streets. The Skaneateles Festival is where famous violinist Hilary Hahn played her first concerts as a young girl.

=== Historic sites ===
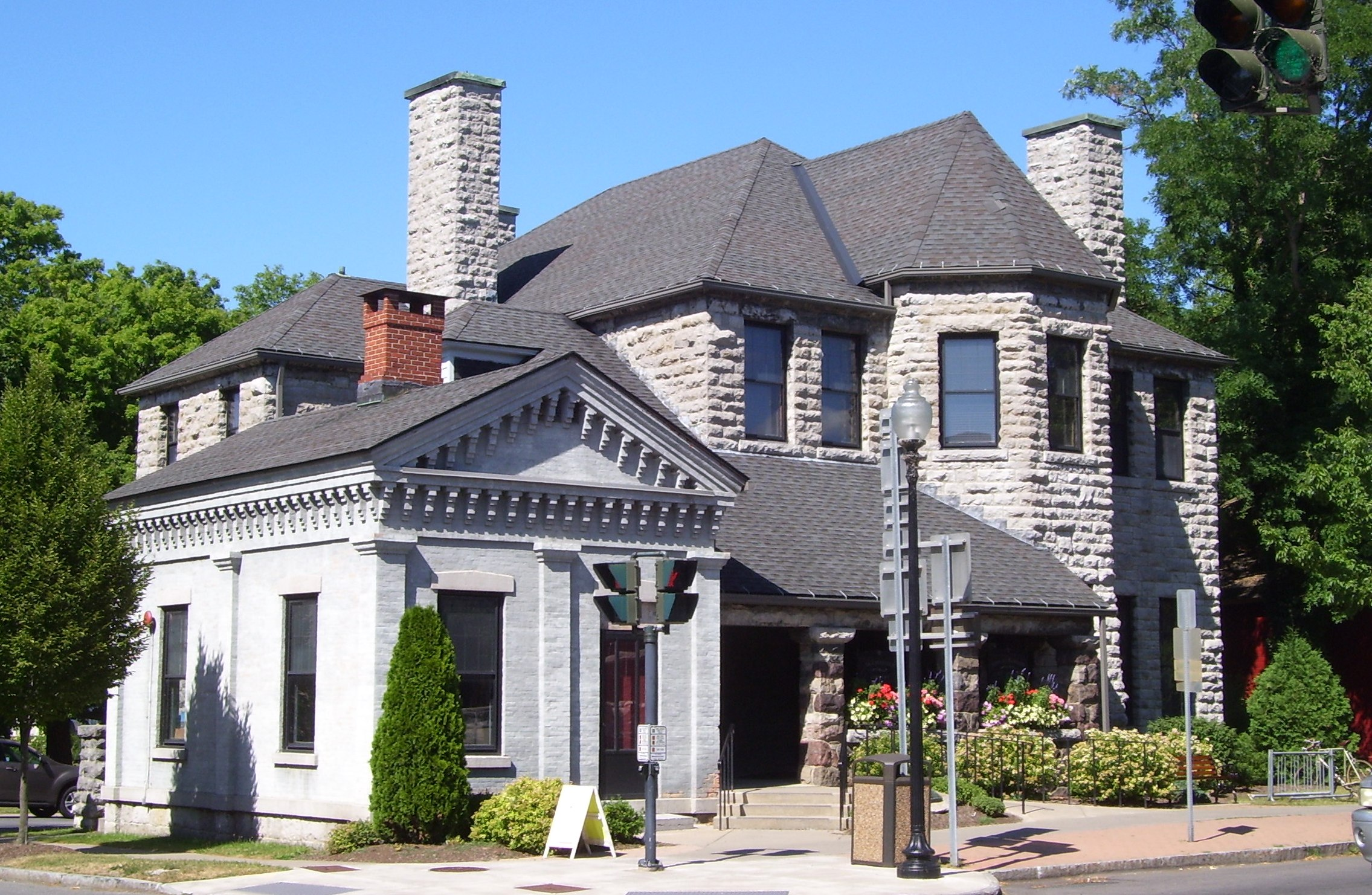
The Skaneateles Library and John D. Barrow Art Gallery (1886–87), part of the Historic District

Properties in Skaneateles which are listed in the National Register of Historic Places are:

- Brook Farm
- Community Place
- James and Lydia Canning Fuller House
- Hazelhurst
- Kelsey–Davey Farm
- Skaneateles Historic District
- Reuel E. Smith House

== Notable people ==
- Frances Julia Barnes (1846–1920), temperance reformer
- Harold Everett Porter (1887–1936), short story writer under the pseudonym 'Holworthy Hall'
- Clara Cannucciari (1915–2013), Great Depression cooking show host, author, YouTube personality
- Barry Crimmins (1953–2018), American stand-up comedian, political satirist, activist, author, writer and correspondent, and comedy club owner

== See also ==
- Skaneateles Short Line Railroad
