= Securities Fraud Deterrence and Investor Restitution Act =

The Securities Fraud Deterrence and Investor Restitution Act was H.R. 2179 (2003-2004) and is a bill currently on the Union Calendar.

Its official titles as introduced, is To enhance the authority of the Securities and Exchange Commission to investigate, punish, and deter securities laws violations, and to improve its ability to return funds to defrauded investors, and for other purposes but was also known as the Securities Fraud Deterrence and Investor Restitution Act of 2003. The bill is sponsored by representative Richard H. Baker and cosponsored by Rep. Sue W. Kelly, Rep. Doug Ose, Rep. Michael G. Oxley, Rep. David Scott, and Rep. Patrick J. Tiberi.

A committee was assigned to H.R. 2179; the House Financial Services committee whose activity is referral, markup, reporting; and in the House Financial Services Subcommittee on Capital Markets, Insurance and Government-Sponsored Enterprises whose activity is referral, hearings, markup, reporting

H.R. 2179 has been discharged by the House Judiciary committee.

== Major actions ==
- 5/21/2003 Introduced in House
- 4/27/2004 Reported (Amended) by the Committee on Financial Services. H. Rept. 108-475, Part I.
- 6/1/2004 Committee on Judiciary discharged.
- 6/1/2004 Placed on the Union Calendar, Calendar No. 298.

== General ==
The Securities Fraud Deterrence and Investor Restitution Act of 2004 would have:

- Amended the Sarbanes-Oxley Act of 2002 to declare that the authority of the Securities and Exchange Commission to satisfy a judgment or administrative order based upon an alleged violation of securities laws is not subject to: a debtor's election under Federal law to exempt property under State or local law; or any State homestead provisions (thus preempting State homestead exemptions which protect property from foreclosure and forced sale for the payment of debts).
- Amended the Securities Act of 1933, the Securities Exchange Act of 1934, the Investment Company Act of 1940, and the Investment Advisers Act of 1940 where it authorizes the SEC to impose civil penalties in cease and desist proceedings and it increases maximum civil money penalties; and authorize the SEC to do nationwide service of process in any proceeding instituted by the SEC.
- Amended the Securities Exchange Act of 1934 to revise conditions under which the SEC is authorized to: access financial records held by a financial institution without notice to the affected client if the SEC acts pursuant to an administrative or judicial subpoena to enforce the securities laws; and transfer such records or the information contained therein to any government authority.
- Amended the Sarbanes-Oxley Act of 2002 to authorize disclosure of grand jury matters to the SEC for use in relation to any matter within its jurisdiction if the court finds a substantial need in the public interest.
- Amended the Securities Exchange Act of 1934 to authorize the SEC to retain private legal counsel for services for any claim of indebtedness resulting from a judgment or order it has obtained in a judicial or administrative proceeding.
- Amended the Sarbanes-Oxley Act of 2002 to provide that civil penalty money obtained by the SEC pursuant to judicial or administrative action shall, upon SEC motion or direction, be added to a fund for the benefit of victims of securities laws violations. (Under current law such money may be added only if the SEC obtains a court order for disgorgement, or if a person agrees in settlement of a disgorgement action to make such a disgorgement).
- Directed the SEC to seek to produce a joint study with representatives of State governments concerning improved coordination, cooperation and communication between the SEC and State securities regulators.
- Authorized the SEC to allow a State that has received penalty or disgorgement payments for securities fraud to contribute those payments to a fund administered by the SEC for the purpose of making restitution payments to investors, whether or not the SEC was a party to the agreement or settlement, or had established such fund prior to the State's contribution. (The bill as introduced requires that civil penalties and disgorgement proceeds obtained in State actions for securities laws violations be remitted to the SEC for distribution to such victims' benefit fund.)
- Cited procedural guidelines for the SEC to use certain undistributed funds or disgorgement proceeds for certain investor education programs, including financial literacy.
- Directed the SEC to prohibit as unreasonable or deceptive any fee under a 12b-1 plan (to use assets to pay distribution-related costs) charged by a registered open-end investment company for any activity other than shareholder servicing activities whose costs are collected directly and transparently from the investor.
- Amended the Investment Company Act of 1940 to expand disclosure duties of investment advisers and principal underwriters at contract renewal procedures to: provide the independent directors of a registered investment company with all material information about any business practice that may conflict with the best interests of the shareholders of such company; and specify and commit to implement procedures designed to ensure services are provided in the best interests of such shareholders.
- Stated that an additional duty of independent directors is to determine whether the specified procedures of the investment adviser and the principal underwriter offer a reasonable likelihood of protecting the best interests of the shareholders of the registered investment company.
- Stated it is unlawful for directors of a registered investment company, when evaluating contract terms for regular service as investment adviser, to take into account the purchase price or other consideration paid in connection with specified transactions.
- Amended the Securities Exchange Act of 1934 to require a registered securities association to: maintain registration, disciplinary, and other data; adopt rules for making inquiries and the type, scope, and presentation of information provided in response them; and establish a process for disputing the accuracy of information provided in response to inquiries.
- Amended the Investment Advisers Act of 1940 to mandate that the SEC require specified designees to respond to inquiries regarding information on registration of investment advisers and their associates (including disciplinary actions, regulatory, judicial, and arbitration proceedings, and other information required by law to be reported).
- Amended the National Securities Markets Improvement Act of 1996 to repeal the mandate that the SEC establish and maintain an electronic system providing investor access to that information.
- Amended the Investment Company Act of 1940 to require the board of directors of a registered company to select a lead independent director who is not an interested person and who shall: have authority to place items on the agenda for consideration, call meetings, and obtain outside advice on behalf of the independent directors; and have such other authority as the SEC determines necessary or useful. States that this requirement does not apply if the chairman of the board is an independent director.
- Directed the SEC to conduct a thorough review of the financial statements contained in the most recent periodic disclosures filed by the largest 250 reporting issuers (and as many other reporting issuers as it finds appropriate).
- Authorized the SEC to require that an issuer's response be accompanied by an auditor's opinion as to whether: that response presents information in accordance with generally accepted accounting principles, and the auditor reached that conclusion after applying generally accepted auditing standards to the response.
- Expressed the sense of Congress that the Administrator of the Investor Education Fund of the 2003 Global Research Analyst Settlement should award: $5 million of the Investor Education Fund in the form of competitive grants to economic education programs administered by national non-profit educational organizations whose primary purpose is improving the quality of minority and low-income individuals' understanding of personal finance and economics; and $5 million of the Investor Education Fund in the form of competitive grants to economic education programs administered by national non-profit educational organizations whose primary purpose is improving the quality of elementary and secondary students' understanding of personal finance and economics.

== See also ==
- Fraud Act 2006

== Resource(s) ==
- Thomas. Library of Congress. http://thomas.loc.gov/cgi-bin/bdquery/z?d108:HR02179:@@@L&summ2=m& (Retrieved Feb. 5, 2007).
