= List of efforts to impeach vice presidents of the United States =

The Constitution of the United States gives Congress the authority to remove the vice president of the United States from office in two separate proceedings. The first one takes place in the House of Representatives, which impeaches the vice president by approving articles of impeachment through a simple majority vote. The second proceeding, the impeachment trial, takes place in the Senate. There, conviction on any of the articles requires a two-thirds majority vote and would result in the removal from office (if currently sitting), and possible debarment from holding future office.

No U.S. vice president has been impeached. One has gone through an impeachment inquiry, however, without being formally impeached.

There is currently an open question as to whether a Vice President would preside over their own impeachment trial. As President of the Senate, the Vice President may preside over all impeachment trials, except when the President is tried, in which case the Chief Justice of the United States presides. Theoretically, nothing prevents the Vice President from presiding over their own impeachment trial.

== Vice presidents who requested an impeachment inquiry ==
=== John C. Calhoun ===
In 1826, Vice President John C. Calhoun himself requested a House impeachment inquiry be launched into him regarding allegations that he had profited from a contract during his tenure as U.S. secretary of war. His request was granted, and a House select committee conducted an impeachment inquiry which, in only a matter of weeks, found Calhoun innocent of wrongdoing.

=== Spiro Agnew ===
On September 26, 1973, a request by Vice President Spiro Agnew that an impeachment inquiry into him be launched was denied by Speaker of the House Carl Albert. Agnew had requested such an inquiry to investigate charges that he had received bribes from construction companies during his tenure as governor of Maryland. Agnew cited the precedent in which Calhoun had requested and been granted an impeachment inquiry into himself in 1826. Agnew had hoped that a House investigation could serve as an alternate to a grand jury investigation and court litigation.

Albert discussed the potential inquiry with House Democratic leaders and House Parliamentarian Lewis Deschler, before deciding against granting one to Agnew.

Bella Abzug argued that this was the right decision, as the House needed to instead focus on starting an impeachment inquiry against President Richard Nixon relating to the Watergate break in.

Weeks later, on October 10, 1973, as part of a plea bargain relating to a charge of tax evasion, Agnew resigned as vice president.

== Impeachment resolutions ==
=== Schuyler Colfax ===
Vice President Schuyler Colfax's name surfaced during witness testimony in a House investigation of the Crédit Mobilier scandal.

Under this cloud of suspicion, on February 20, 1873 (less than a month before Colfax's term expired), Representative Fernando Wood introduced a resolution to investigate the vice president's conduct. The House voted 105 to 109 not to consider it. James Noble Tyner then presented a second resolution which would refer the testimony to the House Committee on the Judiciary "with instructions to inquire whether anything in such testimony warrants articles of impeachment of any officer of the United States not a Member of this House, or makes it proper that further investigation should be ordered in this case." This second resolution was agreed to without debate or division. On February 24, Benjamin Butler submitted the committee's report. Debate was held briefly on February 24, before being postponed to February 26. Debate does not appear to have been taken up again.

The main reasons why impeachment failed to arise are believed to be that the incident in question took place during Colfax's tenure as a representative (not as vice president), and because, when the actions became known, only a few weeks remained before his term expired.

=== Dick Cheney ===
In April 2007, Representative Dennis Kucinich filed impeachment resolution (H.Res. 333) against Vice President Dick Cheney, seeking his trial in the Senate on three charges, including deceiving the public and Congress about the alleged presence of weapons of mass destruction in Iraq. After months of inaction, Kucinich re-introduced the exact content of H. Res 333 as a new resolution numbered H.Res. 799 in November 2007.

Both resolutions were referred to the Judiciary Committee immediately after their introduction and the Committee did not consider either. Both resolutions expired upon the termination of the 110th United States Congress on January 3, 2009.

=== Kamala Harris ===
On September 24, 2021, Representative Lauren Boebert introduced a resolution to impeach Vice President Kamala Harris over Harris's support for the withdrawal of U.S. troops from Afghanistan. It was cosponsored by Representatives Bob Good and Ralph Norman. The resolution was referred to the House Committee on the Judiciary the same day, with no further action being taken.

On June 12, 2023, Representative Andy Ogles introduced a resolution to impeach Harris for the Biden administration's handling of security at the U.S.–Mexico border. It was co-sponsored by Boebert and Mary Miller. It was referred to the House Committee on the Judiciary.

On July 23, 2024, Ogles introduced a second resolution to impeach Harris for "betray[ing] the trust of the public" over not employing the provisions of the 25th Amendment to assume Joe Biden's presidential powers and duties, and for failing in her duties as "border czar".

== Other ==
=== Andrew Johnson ===
After Andrew Johnson's drunken behavior at the second inauguration of Abraham Lincoln (where Johnson was sworn-in as vice president), Senator Charles Sumner considered seeking to persuade members of the House of Representatives to pursue an impeachment and went as far as researching precedent on federal impeachment.

== See also ==
- List of efforts to impeach presidents of the United States
- List of impeachment investigations of United States federal officials
- List of unsuccessful efforts to impeach United States federal officials
