= List of efforts to impeach presidents of the United States =

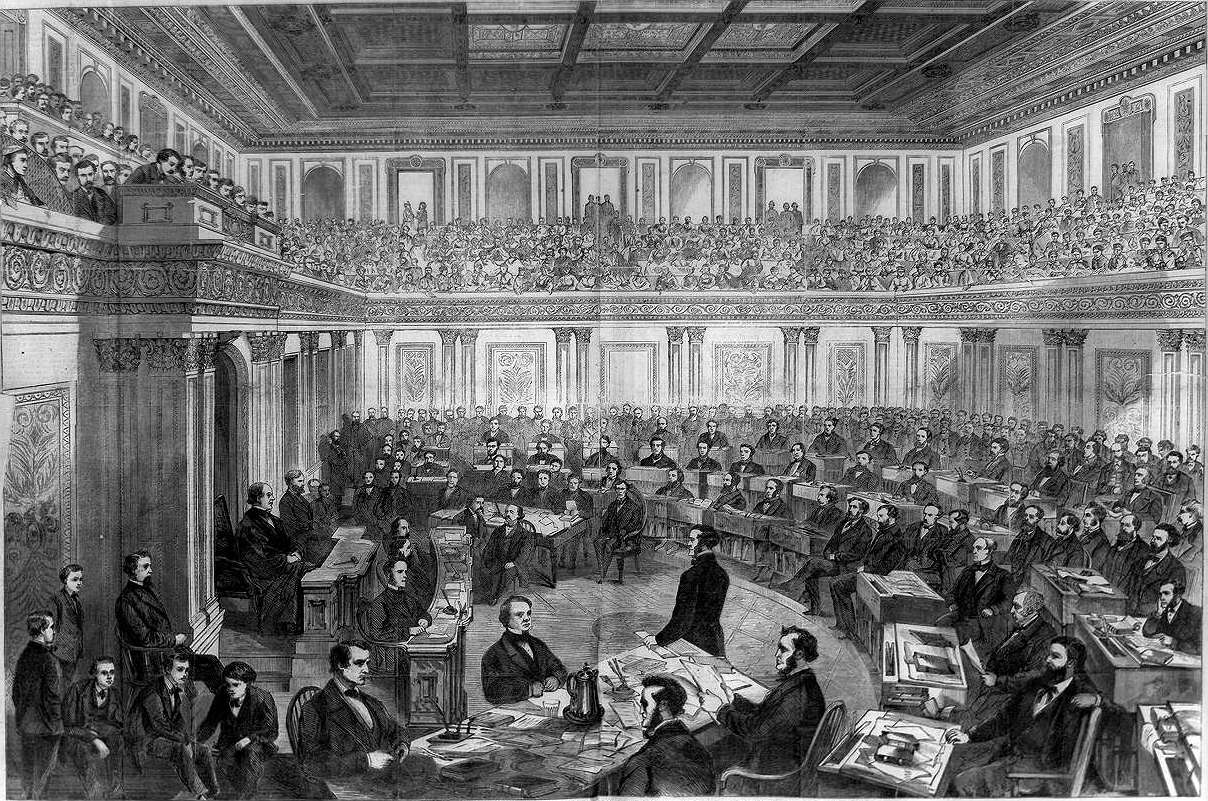
The impeachment trial of President Andrew Johnson in 1868, with Chief Justice of the United States Salmon P. Chase presiding

The Constitution of the United States gives Congress the authority to remove the president of the United States from office in two separate proceedings. The first one takes place in the House of Representatives, which impeaches the president by approving articles of impeachment through a simple majority vote. The second proceeding, the impeachment trial, takes place in the Senate. There, conviction on any of the articles requires a two-thirds majority vote and would result in the removal from office (if currently sitting), and possible debarment from holding future office.

Many U.S. presidents have been subject to demands for impeachment by groups and individuals. Three presidents have been impeached, although none were convicted: Andrew Johnson in 1868, Bill Clinton in 1998, and Donald Trump twice, in 2019 and 2021. Additionally, impeachment proceedings were commenced against two other presidents, John Tyler, in 1843, and Richard Nixon, in 1974, for his role in the Watergate scandal, but he resigned from office after the House Judiciary Committee adopted three articles of impeachment against him (1. obstruction of justice, 2. abuse of power, and 3. contempt of Congress), but before the House could vote on any article.

== Impeachments ==
=== Andrew Johnson ===
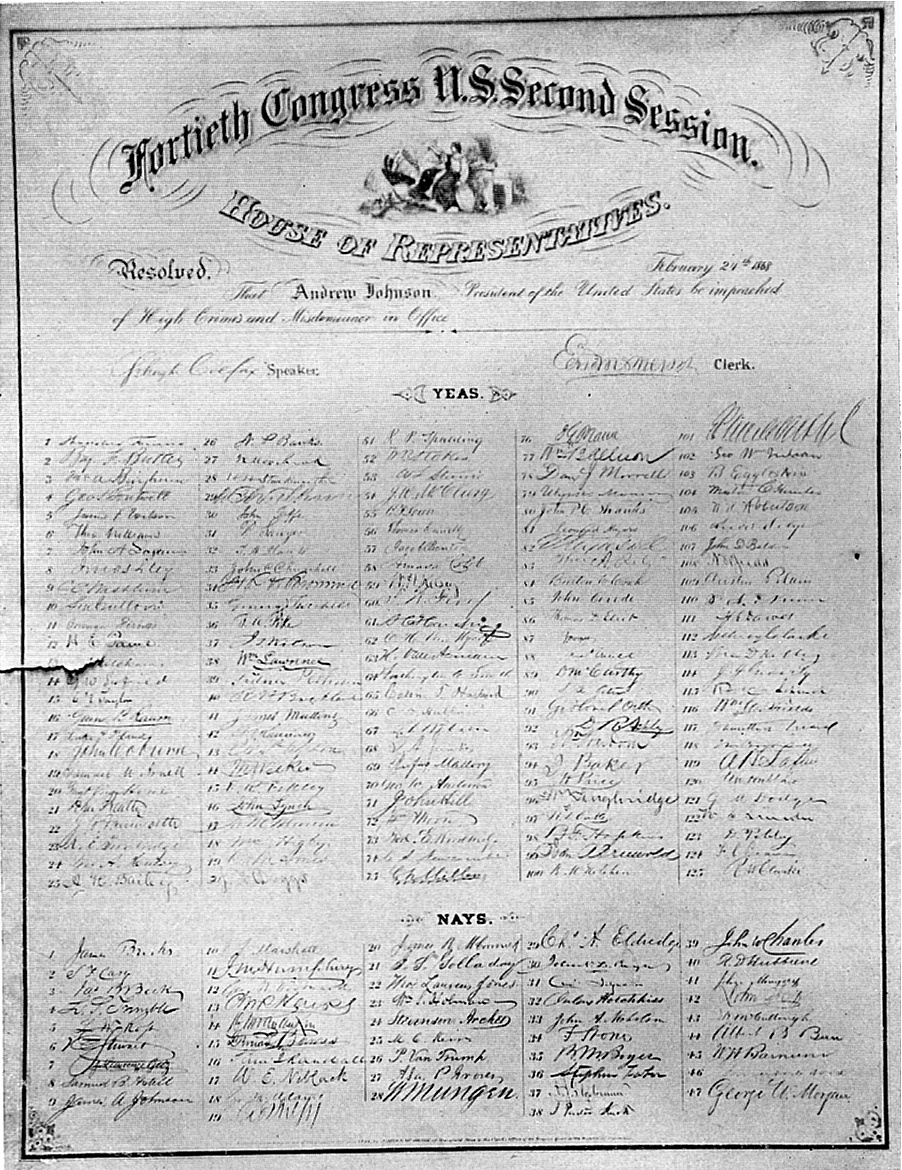
The impeachment resolution against Andrew Johnson, adopted on February 24, 1868

President Andrew Johnson held open disagreements with Congress, who tried to remove him several times. The Tenure of Office Act was enacted over Johnson's veto to curb his power and he openly violated it in early 1868.

The House of Representatives adopted 11 articles of impeachment against Johnson.

Chief Justice Salmon P. Chase presided over Johnson's Senate trial. Conviction failed by one vote in May 1868. The impeachment trial remained a unique event for 130 years.

=== Bill Clinton ===
Remarks including response to Monica Lewinsky scandal (January 26, 1998)
Bill Clinton making a presentation that ends with a short commentary on the Monica Lewinsky scandal. The presentation is known for the quote "I did not have sexual relations with that woman, Miss Lewinsky." (6:20)

Remarks including response to Monica Lewinsky scandal (January 26, 1998)
audio only version

On October 8, 1998, the House of Representatives voted to launch an impeachment inquiry into President Bill Clinton, in part because of allegations that he lied under oath when being investigated in the Clinton–Lewinsky scandal.

On December 19, 1998, two articles of impeachment were approved by the House, charging Clinton with perjury and obstruction of justice. The charges stemmed from a sexual harassment lawsuit filed against Clinton by Arkansas state employee Paula Jones and from Clinton's testimony denying that he had engaged in a sexual relationship with White House intern Monica Lewinsky. They were:

Article I, charged Clinton with perjury. Article II, charged Clinton with obstruction of justice.

Chief Justice William Rehnquist presided over Clinton's Senate trial. Both articles of impeachment failed to receive the required super-majority, and so Clinton was acquitted and was not removed from office.

=== Donald Trump ===
House votes on Article I and II of House Resolution 755

==== First impeachment ====
After a whistleblower accused President Donald Trump of pressuring a foreign government to interfere on Trump's behalf prior to the 2020 election, the House initiated an impeachment inquiry. On December 10, 2019, the Judiciary Committee approved two articles of impeachment (H.Res. 755): abuse of power and obstruction of Congress. On December 18, 2019, the House voted to impeach Trump on two charges:

1. Abuse of power by "pressuring Ukraine to investigate his political rivals ahead of the 2020 election while withholding a White House meeting and $400 million in U.S. security aid from Kyiv."
2. Obstruction of Congress by directing defiance of subpoenas issued by the House and ordering officials to refuse to testify.

On January 31, 2020, the Senate voted 51–49 against calling witnesses or issuing subpoenas for any additional documents. On February 5, 2020, the Senate found Trump not guilty of abuse of power, by a vote of 48–52, with Republican senator Mitt Romney being the only senator—and the first senator in U.S. history—to cross party lines by voting to convict, and not guilty of obstruction of Congress, by a vote of 47–53.

Chief Justice John Roberts presided over Trump's first trial. As both articles of impeachment failed to receive the required super-majority, Trump was acquitted and was not removed from office.

==== Second impeachment ====
Trump was impeached for a second time after he was alleged to incite a deadly attack on the United States Capitol by attempting to overturn the 2020 presidential election results after his loss to Joe Biden. On January 13, 2021, the House voted to impeach Trump for "Incitement of Insurrection".

Although Trump's term ended on January 20, the trial in the Senate began on February 9. On February 13, the Senate found Trump not guilty of incitement of insurrection, by a vote of 57 for conviction and 43 against, below the 67 votes needed for a supermajority. In previous impeachment proceedings, only one senator had ever voted to convict a president of their own party. This time, seven Republican senators found Trump guilty, making it the most bipartisan impeachment trial.

As Trump was no longer president, the president pro tempore of the Senate Patrick Leahy presided over Trump's second trial. As the article of impeachment failed to receive the required supermajority, Trump was acquitted.

=== Table of impeachment trial results ===
Impeachment trial votes
Vote		Guilty		Not guilty		Result
Vote		Votes	%	Votes	%	Result
Impeachment trial of Andrew Johnson	Article II	35	64.82%	19	35.19%	Acquittal
Impeachment trial of Andrew Johnson	Article III	35	64.82%	19	35.19%	Acquittal
Impeachment trial of Andrew Johnson	Article XI	35	64.82%	19	35.19%	Acquittal
Impeachment trial of Andrew Johnson	Articles I, IV, VI, VII, VIII, IX, X	no vote held				Acquittal
Impeachment trial of Bill Clinton	Article I	45	45%	55	55%	Acquittal
Impeachment trial of Bill Clinton	Article II	50	50%	50	50%	Acquittal
First impeachment trial of Donald Trump	Article I	48	48%	52	52%	Acquittal
First impeachment trial of Donald Trump	Article II	47	47%	53	53%	Acquittal
Second impeachment trial of Donald Trump		57	57%	43	43%	Acquittal

== Resignation during an impeachment process ==
=== Richard Nixon ===
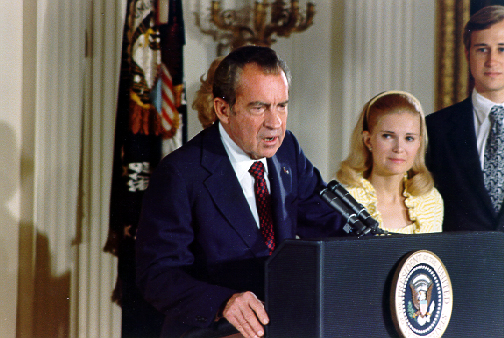
Outgoing President Richard Nixon's farewell speech to the White House staff, August 9, 1974

The House Judiciary Committee approved three articles of impeachment against President Richard Nixon for obstruction of justice, abuse of power, and contempt of Congress for his role in the Watergate scandal.

On October 20, 1973, Nixon ordered the firing of Special Prosecutor Archibald Cox, precipitating the Saturday Night Massacre. A massive reaction took place, especially in Congress, where 17 resolutions were introduced between November 1, 1973, and January 1974: H.Res. 625, H.Res. 635, H.Res. 643, H.Res. 648, H.Res. 649, H.Res. 650, H.Res. 652, H.Res. 661, H.Res. 666, H.Res. 686, H.Res. 692, H.Res. 703, H.Res. 513, H.Res. 631, H.Res. 638, and H.Res. 662. H.Res. 803, passed February 6, authorized a Judiciary Committee investigation, and in July, that committee approved three articles of impeachment. Before the House took action, the impeachment proceedings against Nixon were made moot when Nixon resigned on August 9, 1974. A report containing articles of impeachment was accepted by the full House on August 20, 1974, by a vote of 412–3.

Although Nixon was never formally impeached, this is the only impeachment attempt to result in the president resigning from office. In September 1974, his successor, Gerald Ford, pardoned Nixon for any crimes against the United States that he might have committed while president.

== Investigations without impeachment ==
=== James Buchanan ===
In 1860, the House of Representatives set up the United States House Select Committee to Investigate Alleged Corruptions in Government, known as the Covode Committee after its chairman, Rep. John Covode (R-PA), to investigate President James Buchanan on suspicion of bribery and other allegations. After about a year of hearings, the committee concluded that Buchanan's actions did not merit impeachment.

=== Andrew Johnson ===
On January 7, 1867, the House of Representatives voted to approve an impeachment inquiry run by the House Committee on the Judiciary, which initially ended in a June 3, 1867 vote by the committee to recommend against forwarding articles of impeachment to the full House. However, on November 25, 1867, the House Committee on the Judiciary, which had not previously forwarded the result of its inquiry to the full House, reversed their previous decision, and voted in a 5–4 vote to recommend impeachment proceedings, however, the full House rejected this recommendation by a 108–56 vote. Johnson would later, separately, be impeached in 1868.

=== Joe Biden ===
On January 21, 2021, the day after the inauguration of Joe Biden, Rep. Marjorie Taylor Greene (R-GA) filed articles of impeachment against the president. She cited abusing his power while serving as vice president. Her articles of impeachment claimed that Viktor Shokin was investigating the founder of Burisma Holdings, a natural gas giant in Ukraine. Biden's son Hunter Biden had served as a member of the board since 2014. However, Shokin was not investigating the company. There is no concrete evidence that suggests Biden had pressured Ukraine to benefit his son.

In June 2021, Donald Trump expressed interest in running for a House of Representatives seat in Florida in the 2022 midterm elections, getting himself elected Speaker of the House, and then beginning an impeachment inquiry into President Biden.

Following the withdrawal of U.S. military forces from Afghanistan, the fall of Kabul on August 15, 2021, and the subsequent attack at Kabul International Airport, several Republicans, including Greene, Lauren Boebert, Ronny Jackson, and especially Senators Rick Scott and Lindsey Graham, called for either the stripping of powers and duties (via the 25th Amendment) or removal from office (via impeachment) of Biden if Americans and allies were left behind and held hostage in Afghanistan by the Taliban. House Minority Leader Kevin McCarthy pledged a “day of reckoning” against Biden. Some Republicans, including Josh Hawley and Marsha Blackburn, called for Vice President Kamala Harris and other Cabinet officials to be removed as well. Mitch McConnell did not call for an impeachment inquiry into Biden, however, as Republicans did not have the majority in either the House or Senate.

In January 2022, Senator Ted Cruz (R-TX) predicted that if Republicans won control of the House of Representatives in the 2022 elections, they would likely move to impeach Biden "whether it's justified or not". In August The Hill reported that impeaching Biden was "a top priority" for House Republicans, should they win control of that body in the 2022 mid-term elections, as they eventually did.

In June 2023, the House voted to pass a rule that referred an impeachment resolution against Biden to a committee. The resolution was offered by Republican Representative Lauren Boebert of Colorado. The referral to the committee effectively paused a move to bring a privileged motion to the floor, which would have required members of the House to vote on whether to impeach Biden. The resolution was met with division among House Republicans, and Speaker Kevin McCarthy urged members of the GOP to vote against it. Boebert stated that she pushed for the vote to force her colleagues to make difficult decisions.

Speaker Kevin McCarthy in September 2023 directed three House committees to open a formal impeachment inquiry. In December, under the leadership of Speaker Mike Johnson, the whole House voted 221-213 to formally initiate an impeachment inquiry. The committees — Oversight, Judiciary, and Ways and Means — jointly reported findings in August 2024 that alleged several impeachable offenses and withholding of evidence.

== Inquiries voted down by the full House ==
=== Thomas Jefferson ===
On January 25, 1809, Representative Josiah Quincy III (a Federalist from Massachusetts) introduced resolutions which would launch an impeachment inquiry into President Thomas Jefferson, by then a lame duck who was scheduled to leave office on March 4, 1809. Quincy alleged that Jefferson had committed a "high misdemeanor" by keeping Benjamin Lincoln, the Port of Boston's customs collector, in that federal office despite Lincoln's own protests that he was too old and too weak to continue with his job. In 1806, Lincoln had written Jefferson proposing his own resignation, but Jefferson requested that Lincoln continue in the office until he appointed a successor. Quincy argued that, by leaving Lincoln in the post, Jefferson had unfairly enabled a federal official to receive a $5,000 annual salary, "for doing no services".

The resolution received immediate resistance from both Federalists and Democratic-Republicans, and saw 17 members of the House speak against even providing consideration of the resolution. Quincy refused to withdraw his resolution, despite the immense opposition. Congressmen argued that the act of requesting Lincoln remain in office was not a high crime nor a misdemeanor, and that there was not even evidence of inefficient management of the customs house. The House voted 93–24 to allow consideration of the resolution. After consideration, it was rejected by a vote of 117–1, with Quincy being the sole supporter.

=== John Tyler ===
After President John Tyler vetoed a tariff bill in June 1842, a committee headed by former president John Quincy Adams, then a representative, condemned Tyler's use of the veto and stated that Tyler should be impeached. (This was not only a matter of the Whigs supporting the bank and tariff legislation which Tyler vetoed. Until the presidency of the Whigs' archenemy Andrew Jackson, presidents vetoed bills rarely, and then generally on constitutional rather than policy grounds, so Tyler's actions also went against the Whigs' concept of the presidency.) In August, the House accepted this report, which implied that impeachable offenses had been committed by Tyler, in a vote of 100–80.

Tyler criticized the House for, what he argued, was a vote effectively charging him with impeachable offenses without actually impeaching him of such offenses, thus denying him the ability to defend himself against these charges in a Senate trial.

Representative John Botts (Whig-VA), who opposed Tyler (who was a member of the same party Tyler had up until recently been a member of), introduced an impeachment resolution on July 10, 1842, that levied several charges against Tyler regarding his use of the presidential veto power and called for a nine-member committee to investigate his actions, with the expectation of a formal impeachment recommendation. The impeachment resolution was defeated in a 127–83 vote on January 10, 1843.

== Inquiries proposed but not put to a House vote ==
=== Ulysses S. Grant ===
Representative Joseph Clay Stiles Blackburn (D-KY) introduced an impeachment resolution against President Ulysses S. Grant in 1876, regarding the number of days Grant had been absent from the White House. The resolution never gained momentum and was tabled in December 1876.

=== Grover Cleveland ===
Representative Milford W. Howard (Populist-AL), on May 23, 1896, submitted a resolution (H.Res 374) impeaching President Grover Cleveland for selling unauthorized federal bonds and breaking the Pullman Strike. It was neither voted on nor referred to a committee.

=== Herbert Hoover ===
During the 1932–33 lame duck session of Congress, on December 13, 1932, and on January 17, 1933, Representative Louis T. McFadden (R-PA) introduced two impeachment resolutions against President Herbert Hoover, over economic grievances. The resolutions were read and then immediately tabled by overwhelming votes.

=== Harry S. Truman ===
In April 1951, President Harry S. Truman fired General of the Army Douglas MacArthur. Congressional Republicans responded with numerous calls for Truman's removal. The Senate held hearings, and a year later, Representatives George H. Bender and Paul W. Shafer separately introduced House bills 607 and 614 against Truman. The resolutions were referred to the Judiciary Committee but were not considered by the Democratic-held Senate.

On April 22, 1952, Representative Noah M. Mason (R-IL) suggested that impeachment proceedings should be started against Truman for seizing the nation's steel mills. Soon after Mason's remarks, Representative Robert Hale (R-ME) introduced a resolution (H.Res. 604). After three days of debate on the floor of the House, it was referred to the House Judiciary Committee, but no action was taken.

=== Ronald Reagan ===
In 1983, Representative Henry B. González was joined by Ted Weiss, John Conyers, George Crockett Jr., Julian Dixon, Mervyn Dymally, Gus Savage, and Parren Mitchell in proposing a resolution impeaching President Ronald Reagan for "the high crime or misdemeanor of ordering the invasion of Grenada in violation of the Constitution of the United States, and other high crime or misdemeanor ancillary thereto."

On March 5, 1987, González introduced H.Res. 111, with six articles against Reagan regarding the Iran–Contra affair to the House Judiciary Committee, where no further action was taken. While no further action was taken on this particular bill, it led directly to the joint hearings of the subject that dominated the news later that year. After the hearings were over, USA Today reported that articles of impeachment were discussed but decided against.

U.S. Attorney General Edwin Meese acknowledged, in testimony at the trial of Reagan aide Oliver North, that officials in the Reagan administration had been worried that the 1987 impeachment could result in Reagan having to resign.

=== George H. W. Bush ===
President George H. W. Bush was subject to two resolutions over the Gulf War in 1991, both by Representative Henry B. González (D-TX). H.Res. 34 was introduced on January 16, 1991, and was referred to the House Committee on Judiciary and then its Subcommittee on Economic and Commercial Law on March 18, 1992. H.Res. 86 was introduced on February 21, 1991, and referred to the House Judiciary Committee, where no further action was taken on it.

=== George W. Bush ===
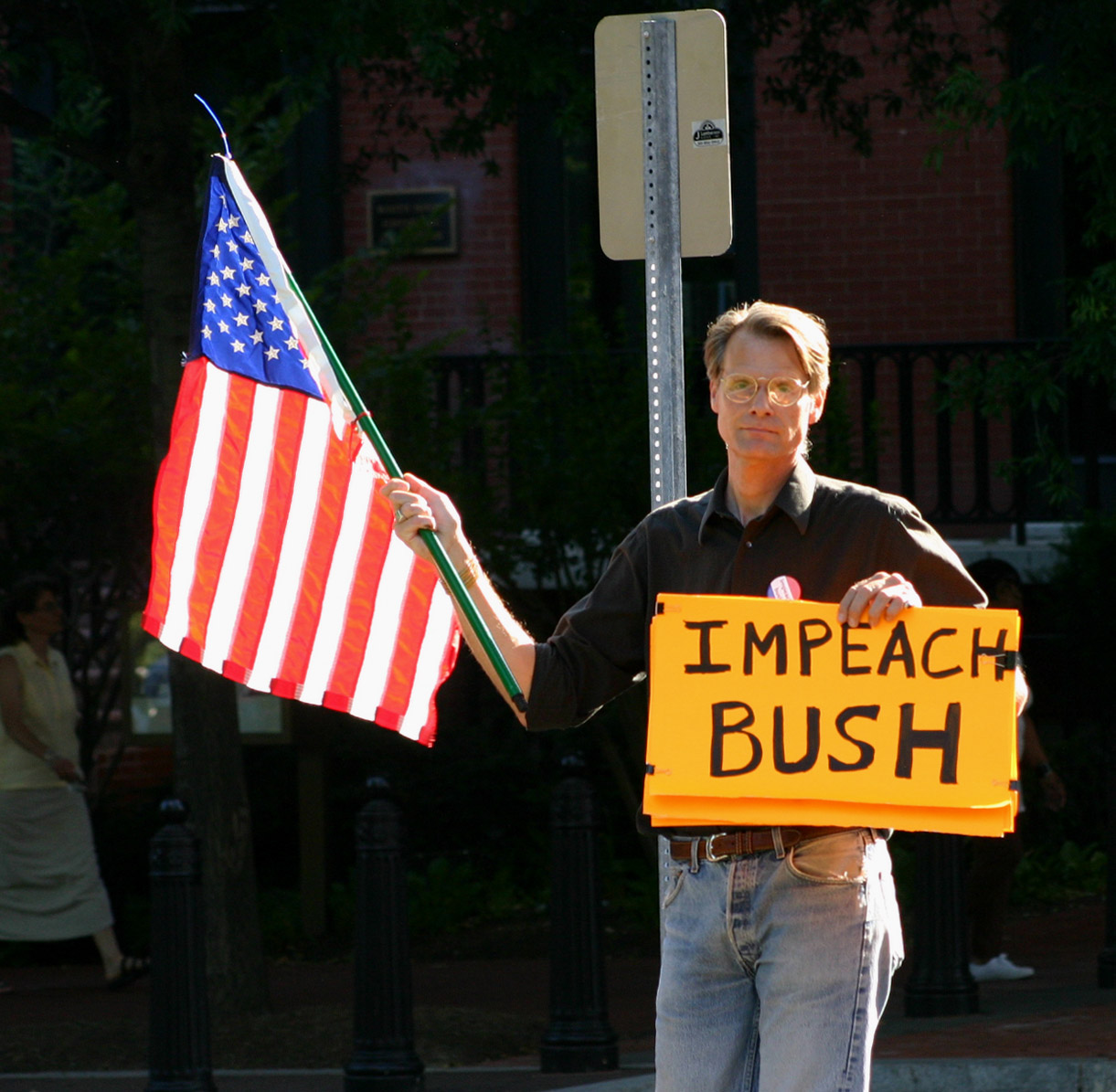
A protester calling for the impeachment of President George W. Bush on June 16, 2005

During the administration of President George W. Bush, several politicians sought to either investigate him for possible impeachable offenses or to bring actual impeachment charges. The most significant of these occurred on June 10, 2008, when Representatives Dennis Kucinich (D-OH) and Robert Wexler (D-FL) introduced H.Res. 1258, containing 35 articles of impeachment against Bush. After nearly a day of debate, the House voted 251–166 to refer the impeachment resolution to the House Judiciary Committee on June 11, 2008, where no further action was taken on it.

== Others ==
=== Lyndon B. Johnson ===
On May 3, 1968, a petition to impeach President Lyndon B. Johnson for "military and political duplicity" was referred to the House Judiciary Committee. No action was taken.

=== Barack Obama ===
On December 3, 2013, the House Judiciary Committee held a hearing on President Barack Obama that was formally titled "The President's Constitutional Duty to Faithfully Execute the Laws," which political journalists viewed as an attempt to begin justifying impeachment proceedings. When asked by reporters if this was a hearing about impeachment, Representative Lamar Smith (R-TX) claimed that it was not, saying "I didn't mention impeachment nor did any of the witnesses in response to my questions at the Judiciary Committee hearing." One witness did mention impeachment directly: Georgetown University law professor Nicholas Quinn Rosenkranz said "a check on executive lawlessness is impeachment" as he accused Obama of "claim[ing] the right of the king to essentially stand above the law." Impeachment efforts never advanced past this, making Obama the first president since Jimmy Carter to not have a single article of impeachment referred against him to the House Judiciary Committee during his tenure.

== See also ==
- Censure of Andrew Jackson
- List of efforts to impeach vice presidents of the United States
- List of impeachment investigations of United States federal officials
- List of impeachments of heads of state
