= List of unsuccessful efforts to impeach United States federal officials =

The following is a list efforts which, unsuccessfully, sought to impeach United States federal officials.

While none of these efforts resulted in a formal impeachment, some of them led to the resignation of the individuals targeted.

== Presidents ==
Many presidents have faced unsuccessful attempts at impeachment.

== Vice presidents ==
Several vice presidents have faced unsuccessful attempts at impeachment.

== Cabinet members ==
There have been two cabinet members, William W. Belknap and Alejandro Mayorkas, impeached by the United States House of Representatives. Neither were convicted in their impeachment trial, Other attempts to impeach cabinet members have been largely unsuccessful.

=== Attorneys General ===
While impeachment proceedings against cabinet members is an exceedingly rare event, the Office of the Attorney General has faced the most impeachment attempts. During the first fifth of the 21st century, no less than three Attorneys General have been subjected to the process.

==== Harry M. Daugherty ====
In 1922, the House Judiciary Committee held hearings on whether to impeach Attorney General Harry Daugherty. Despite evidence of wrongdoing, impeachment articles weren't reported to the full House.

However it was his alleged knowledge of a kickback scam involving bootleggers (operated by his chief aide Jess Smith) that led to his eventual resignation on March 28, 1924. As the subject of a U.S. Senate investigation begun the year before, spearheaded under the direction of Senator Burton K. Wheeler of Montana, Daugherty, was eventually found not guilty in the investigation.

==== Griffin Bell ====
On February 6, 1978, a resolution, H. Res. 1002, was introduced authorizing the Judiciary Committee to investigate Attorney General Griffin Bell. The resolution was referred to the Rules Committee. A week later, Rep Philip Crane, introduced H. Res. 1025. It was also referred to the Rules Committee.

==== Alberto Gonzales ====
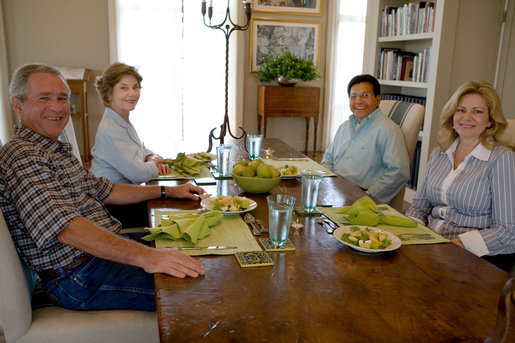
Gonzales and his wife Rebecca, with George W. Bush and Laura Bush at the Prairie Chapel Ranch on August 26, 2007, the day that Gonzales's resignation was accepted.

On July 7, 2007, Rep. Jay Inslee and 31 co-sponsors introduced H. Res. 589, which sought impeachment hearings by the Judiciary Committee against Attorney General Alberto Gonzales. It was referred to the Rules Committee instead. While there were no hearings, pressure mounted, and Gonzales resigned less than two months later.

==== Eric Holder ====
On November 7, 2013, Rep. Ted Yoho announced that he and some colleagues were going to introduce a resolution impeaching Attorney General Holder. On Nov. 12, it was leaked to the press that Congressman Pete Olson (R-TX) and co-sponsors Reps. Phil Roe (R-TN), Ted Yoho (R-FL), Lynn Westmoreland (R-GA), Larry Bucshon (R-IN), Blake Farenthold (R-TX), Randy Weber (R-TX) and Roger Williams (R-TX). had written a detailed set of articles which were introduced as H.Res 411 The resolution was referred to the Judiciary Committee, and no further action was taken.

==== William Barr ====
On June 30, 2020, Tennessee Democratic Representative Steve Cohen and 35 cosponsors introduced a resolution (H.Res.1032) on the House floor calling for the impeachment of Attorney General William Barr for many instances of alleged malfeasance. Hearings on the topic on a more general fashion had already taken place.

Earlier in the month, House Judiciary Chairman Jerry Nadler called the effort a waste of time, citing the impeachment of President Trump earlier in the year, which failed to remove him (see above). However, he changed his mind later.

In-camera hearings were due to begin in July 2020, and Barr did indeed testify before the House Judiciary Committee on July 28. After Ruth Bader Ginsburg, Associate Justice of the U.S. Supreme Court, died on September 18, 2020, several Democratic congressmembers talked about reviving proceedings as a tactic to prevent Trump from nominating a conservative successor to replace the liberal Ginsburg, slowing down the Senate's confirmation process.

Ultimately, Barr was not impeached.

==== Merrick Garland ====
On October 22, 2021, Pennsylvania Republican Representative Scott Perry introduced a resolution, (H.Res.743), to impeach Attorney General Merrick Garland for "high crimes and misdemeanors". The resolution was referred to the House Committee on the Judiciary the same day it was introduced, and never moved past that committee.

On August 12, 2022, following calls from multiple Republican lawmakers to impeach Attorney General Garland, Georgia Republican Representative Marjorie Taylor Greene announced that she planned to impeach Garland as retaliation for Garland approving a search of Mar-A-Lago, the home of former President Donald Trump, to retrieve documents Trump had taken from the White House and stored there. Garland alleged that by doing so, and then withholding the documents from previous requests for their return, Trump had acted illegally. Greene's justification for the impeachment was that the search was "a blatant attempt to persecute a political opponent".

In the end, he was not impeached.

=== Other Cabinet secretaries ===
==== Secretary of the Treasury Andrew Mellon ====
In January 1932, Rep. Wright Patman and others introduced articles of impeachment against Andrew Mellon, with hearings before the House Judiciary Committee at the end of that month. After the hearings were over, but before the scheduled vote on whether to report the articles to the full House, Mellon accepted an appointment to the post of Ambassador to the Court of St. James, and resigned, thus rendering further action on the issue moot.

==== Secretary of the Treasury William Woodin, Eugene Meyer, Andrew Mellon and Federal Reserve Board ====
On May 23, 1933 Rep. Louis Thomas McFadden introduced articles of impeachment against Chair of the Federal Reserve Eugene Meyer, Secretary of Treasury William Woodin, two former Treasury Secretaries (Andrew Mellon and Ogden L. Mills); J. F. T. O'Connor (Comptroller of Currency); John W. Pole (former Comptroller of Currency); four members and three former members of the Federal Reserve Board; twelve Federal Reserve Agents; and one former Federal Reserve Agent. There was a hearing on the subject before the House Judiciary committee, but nothing became of it.

==== Frances Perkins – Labor Secretary, James Houghteling– Immigration and Naturalization Commissioner and Gerard Reilly– Solicitor of the Department of Labor ====
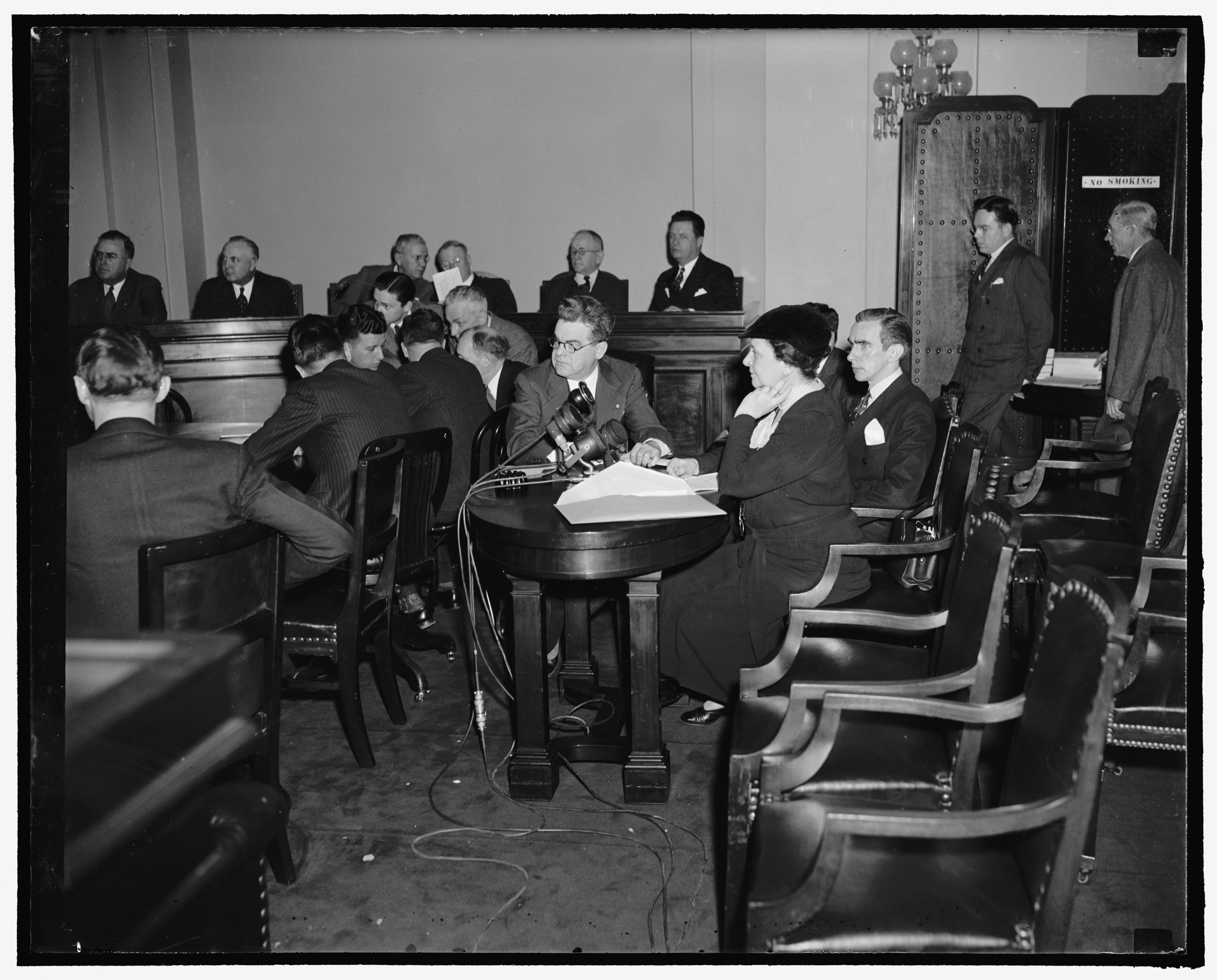
Secretary Frances Perkins defends herself before the Judiciary Committee on February 8, 1939, in response to Congressman Thomas' proposed impeachment resolution.

On January 24, 1939, Rep. J. Parnell Thomas offered an impeachment resolution against the above federal officials. The resolution was referred to the Judiciary Committee, where it died a quiet death.

Congressional conservatives were angered with Secretary Francis Perkins when she had refused to deport Harry Bridges, the head of the International Longshore and Warehouse Union. Bridges, an Australian longshoreman who came to America in 1920, was accused of being a Communist.

==== Donald Rumsfeld – Secretary of Defense of the United States ====
On June 20, 2004, angered by the War in Iraq, Rep. Charles Rangel and four co-sponsors introduced H.Res 629 which sought impeachment hearings by the Judiciary Committee against Secretary Donald Rumsfeld. It was referred to the HJC's subcommittee on the Constitution, where it failed and did not move onto the committee as a whole.

==== Alejandro Mayorkas - Secretary of Homeland Security ====
On January 3, 2024, the United States House of Representatives announced an impeachment inquiry into Homeland Security Secretary Alejandro Mayorkas. The inquiry was conducted by the House's Homeland Security committee. On February 6, 2024, a motion to proceed with impeachment proceedings failed to pass, on a 216–214 vote.

Later on February 13, 2024, the United States House of Representatives successfully impeached Mayorkas in a 214-213 vote. The Democrat-controlled Senate dismissed the charges without a trial, something that has never happened with any impeachment before.

== Federal Reserve Board ==
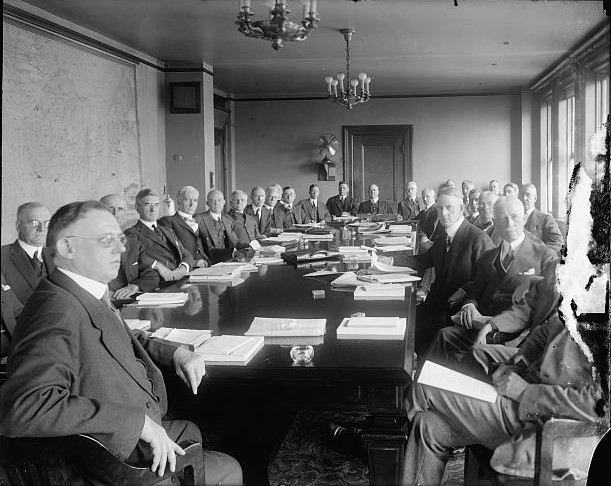
Board of Governors meeting January 1, 1922.

Three attempts to remove all or part of the Federal Reserve Board have failed.

=== Lindbergh's attempt ===
On February 12, 1917, Rep Charles August Lindbergh, father of aviator Charles Lindbergh, offered articles of impeachment against five members of the Federal Reserve Board. The articles were referred to the Judiciary Committee for investigation. On March 3, the Judiciary Committee submitted its report, H.R. Rep. 64-1628, finding insufficient evidence to support impeachment.

=== McFadden's attempt ===
Rep. Louis Thomas McFadden's attempt to impeach numerous officials in May 1933 is detailed above.

=== Gonzalez's attempt ===
On March 7, 1985, Rep. Henry Gonzalez introduced an impeachment resolution, H.R. Res. 101, against Fed Chairman Paul Volcker and ten other members of the Federal Open Market Committee and H.R. Res. 102, against Volcker alone. The resolution was referred to the Judiciary Committee., where it was never heard of again. However, not to be deterred, Gonzalez introduced the bill in each of the next two congresses, and they met the same fate.

== Other officials ==
=== Henry A. Smythe – Collector, Port of New York ===
On March 22, 1867, three resolutions were introduced calling for various types of action against the allegedly corrupt Henry A. Smythe. Rep. Hulburd introduced a resolution calling for the President to remove Smythe from office. Mr. Stevens offered an impeachment resolution against Smythe and called upon the Committee on Public Expenditures to draft articles of impeachment. Finally, Rep.Samuel Shellabarger of Ohio introduced a resolution requesting the Committee on Public Expenditures investigate Smythe's conduct.

The next day, the House resumed debate over these three resolutions. A different resolution was ultimately adopted which did not call for Smythe's impeachment, but rather his immediate removal from office by the President. A copy of the resolution was sent to President Andrew Johnson, who ignored it. Smythe left office in 1869 with the change in administration.

=== Charles Francis Adams, Ambassador to the Court of St. James, and William E. West, American Consul at Dublin ===
On December 2, 1867, Rep. William E. Robinson of New York introduced a resolution to investigate Charles Francis Adams, Sr. and William E. West, and why they hadn't tried to get some American citizens out of jail there. The resolution was then referred to the Foreign Relations Committee, where it died.

=== Oliver B. Bradford, consular clerk of the United States, assigned to Shanghai, China, and postal agent of the United States there ===
In a resolution introduced by Rep. William M. Springer, of Illinois, Bradford was accused of fraud, embezzlement and numerous other charges in relation to the building of a Cross China railroad. While all agreed it was criminal, it wasn't agreed whether or not the office was high enough to warrant impeachment.

=== George F. Seward, Minister plenipotentiary to China ===
On March 3, 1879, as part of the regular order of business was the report of the Committee on Expenditures in the State Department, Rep Springer proposed articles of impeachment against George F. Seward for bribery and theft. The articles were sent to the Judiciary committee, where they died.

=== Lot Wright, United States marshal ===
On December 2, 1884 Rep. John F. Follett, of Ohio introduced a point of privilege demanding that Wright be impeached for using armed deputies to fix an election. The proposition was held to be out of order.

=== Clarence Chase – Collector of Customs, Port of El Paso, Texas ===
Chase was implicated in a Senate hearing before the Committee of Public Lands and Surveys as part of the Tea Pot Dome investigations. The Senate, on March 25, 1924, adopted a resolution, S. Res. 195, referring the matter to the House of Representatives for such proceedings as might be appropriate against Chase. The resolution was referred to the Judiciary Committee. The next day, Chase resigned from office, and no further action was taken by the House.

=== Fredrick Fenning – Commissioner, District of Columbia ===
On April 19, 1926, articles of impeachment against Commissioner Frederick A. Fenning were read on the floor of the House, and a resolution, H.R. Res. 228, to investigate the validity of the charges was adopted. The resolution was referred to the Judiciary Committee. On May 4, 1926, the Judiciary Committee submitted a report, H.R. Rep. No. 69-1075, recommending a complete investigation. A resolution adopting the committee report was passed by the House on May 6, 1926.

On June 9, 1926, Mr. Rankin submitted a brief to the investigating committee supporting Fenning's impeachment. Then on June 16, 1926, after Fenning answered the charges, Rankin submitted a reply brief.

Two committees were involved in the impeachment investigation of Fenning. A preliminary report of a Special Subcommittee of the Committee on the District of Columbia was submitted to the House on June 30, 1926. Then on July 1, the final Judiciary Committee report, H.R. Rep. No. 69-1590, was submitted to the House and later referred to the House Calendar. The proceedings ended with his resignation.

=== H. Snowden Marshall--U.S. District Atty., Southern District of NY ===
On December 14, 1915. Rep. Frank Buchanan of Illinois demanded the impeachment of H. Snowden Marshall, United States District Attorney for the Southern District of New York, for alleged neglect of duty and subservience to "the great criminal trusts," The Chicago Tribune claimed it had been In an effort to stop the grand jury investigation into the activities of Labor's National Peace council.

About a month later, on Buchanan again offered a resolution, H.R. Res. 90, to investigate Marshall. This time the resolution was adopted and referred to the Judiciary Committee for further action.

On January 27, 1916, the House passed a resolution, H.R. Res. 110, granting the Judiciary Committee authority to subpoena witnesses and to use a Subcommittee. A few days later, a Subcommittee of the Judiciary Committee was organized to take testimony. On April 5, the HJC reported its findings, H.R. Rep. No. 64-494, to the House. The Judiciary Committee recommended a Select Committee be appointed to further investigate Marshall. Rep. Kitchins offered a resolution, H.R. Res. 193, to adopt the Judiciary Committee's recommendations. The resolution passed and the Select Committee was formed. The Select Committee report was read into the record on April 14. The report found Marshall guilty of a breach of the privileges of the House and in contempt of the House of Representatives and recommended he be brought to the bar of the House to answer the charges.

On June 20, a resolution, H.R. Res. 268, was submitted which charged Marshall with violating the privileges of the House of Representatives and calling the Speaker to issue a warrant for Marshall's arrest. The resolution was adopted. On June 22, the Speaker signed the warrant.

When Marshall was arrested by the Sergeant at Arms on June 26, he served the Sergeant at Arms with a writ of habeas corpus. The HJC voted to end the investigation on July 16. Marshall's writ eventually went to the United States Supreme Court where Chief Justice White issued the opinion of the court on April 23, 1917. The Court granted the writ and released Marshall from custody. [Marshall v. Gordon, 243 U.S. 521 (1916)].

The Judiciary Committee submitted its last report, H.R. Rep. 64-1077, concerning impeachment efforts against Marshall on August 4, the report, which recommended against impeachment, was referred to the House Calendar.

=== Liam S. Coonan, Special Crime Strike Force Prosecutor for the United States Department of Justice ===
On June 17, 1975, Rep William Clay introduced an impeachment resolution, H.R. Res. 547, against Liam S. Coonan, for doing something unspecified. It was sent to the HJC, where it died.

=== Richard Helms – Ambassador to Iran ===
On July 29, 1975, Rep Robert Drinan introduced an impeachment resolution, H.R. Res. 647, against Ambassador Richard Helms for actions taken as Director of the CIA The resolution was referred to the Judiciary Committee. When nothing happened, Fr. Drinan introduced another impeachment resolution, H.R. Res. 1105, against Ambassador Helms on March 24, 1976. This resolution was also sent to the Judiciary Committee., where it also died.

=== Jonathan Goldstein U.S. attorney for the District of New Jersey, and Bruce Goldstein, principal assistant DA ===
On Nov. 20, 1975, Rep Henry Helstoski introduced an impeachment resolution, H.R. Res. 881, against the Goldsteins, for gratuitous persecution in relation to their investigation of the congressman, which had led to his indictment a month before. It was sent to the HJC, where it died.

=== Paul Rand Dixon, a Commissioner of the Federal Trade Commission ===
On February 9, 1977, Rep. Ed Koch and nine co-sponsors introduced H.R. Res. 274, against Paul Rand Dixon. The resolution was referred to the Judiciary Committee and vanished without a trace.

=== Andrew Young, Ambassador to the United Nations ===
On October 3, 1977, Rep. Lawrence P. McDonald introduced an impeachment resolution, H.R. Res. 805, against Ambassador Andrew Young. The resolution was referred to the Judiciary Committee for action.

Young had met secretly for meetings, in violation of American law, with representatives of the Palestine Liberation Organization, which culminated in Carter asking for Young's resignation. Jimmy Carter denied any complicity in the Andrew Young Affair.

McDonald waited until July 13, 1978, to introduce a second impeachment resolution, H.R. Res. 1267, against him, and this time the resolution was tabled on the House floor.

=== Kenneth W. Starr, an independent counsel of the United States appointed pursuant to 28 United States Code section 593(b) ===
On Sept.18, 1998 Rep. Alcee Hastings, who himself had been impeached and removed as a federal judge, introduced H.RES.545 impeaching Kenneth Starr, whose investigation was leading to the impeachment of President Bill Clinton. Two days later, the House voted to table the bill, 340–71.

Several weeks later, Hastings introduced H. RES. 582, authorizing an investigation to see whether Starr should be impeached. This was referred to the Rules committee, which buried it.

=== Gina McCarthy, Administrator of the United States Environmental Protection Agency ===
On September 11, 2015, Rep Paul A. Gosar and 25 cosponsors introduced H.RES.417 Impeaching Gina McCarthy, Administrator of the Environmental Protection Agency, for high crimes and misdemeanors. These were entirely claims of alleged perjury. This was referred to the House Judiciary, where it died.

=== John Koskinen, Commissioner of the Internal Revenue Service ===
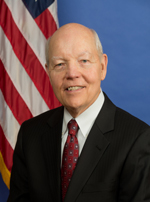
Commissioner Koskinen.

After the Justice Department notified Congress in October 2015 that there would be no charges against Lois Lerner or anyone else in the IRS, 19 Republican members of the House Oversight and Government Reform Committee led by the committee's chairman, Jason Chaffetz (R-Utah), filed a resolution to impeach Koskinen. Those sponsoring the impeachment resolution to remove Koskinen from office accused him of failing to prevent the destruction of evidence in allowing the erasure of back-up tapes containing thousands of e-mails written by Lois Lerner, and of making false statements under oath to Congress. In a statement released by the Committee, Chaffetz said Koskinen "failed to comply with a congressionally issued subpoena, documents were destroyed on his watch, and the public was consistently misled. Impeachment is the appropriate tool to restore public confidence in the IRS and to protect the institutional interests of Congress." The IRS said on October 27 that it did not have an immediate comment on the impeachment resolution. Representative Elijah Cummings (D-Maryland), the committee's top Democrat, said in a statement: "This ridiculous resolution will demonstrate nothing but the Republican obsession with diving into investigative rabbit holes that waste tens of millions of taxpayer dollars while having absolutely no positive impact on a single American. Calling this resolution a 'stunt' or a 'joke' would be insulting to stunts and jokes."

The resolution was referred to the House Judiciary committee, who held hearings on the matter on May 23 and June 22, 2016. The House leadership decided not to proceed any further which led to a discharge petition, which was supposed to be acted upon in September but was delayed until after the election. On December 6, 2016, the House voted to send the question back to the Judiciary Committee, after which it was too late to do anything about it.

=== Rod Rosenstein, Deputy Attorney General ===
On July 25, 2018, after several months of threats, Representatives Mark Meadows and Jim Jordan filed articles of impeachment (H.Res.1028) against Rod Rosenstein for what they say is failure to respond to congressional document demands.

They were immediately sent to the House Judiciary committee. In a speech to donors, Representative Devin Nunes said they would have to wait until after the Senate confirmation of Brett Kavanaugh to the Supreme Court.

While no hearings on the matter were held, the HJC mentioned the situation in its final report on the Clinton email imbroglio and the FBI's early Russia probe.

== Judges ==
=== George Turner ===
On May 10, 1796, the House received a report from the Attorney General on the conduct of George Turner a judge in the Northwest Territory, which included demands for bribes, and the wanton levy of fines without trial. The report was referred to a select committee for further action. On February 16, 1797, Judge Turner requested that a hearing on any potential charges be conducted while he was in town. His request was not granted. Then on February 27, Representative Theophilus Bradbury of Massachusetts submitted the select committee report and a resolution recommending a hearing be held in the Northwest Territory.

This resolution was tabled by the House. However Judge Turner resigned just a few months later.

=== Richard Peters ===
On January 6, 1804, Judge Peters of the District of Pennsylvania was added, by amendment, to a resolution calling for the investigation of Justice Chase. The resolution was adopted on January 7, 1804. The select committee appointed to conduct the impeachment investigation submitted its report to the House on March 6, 1804. A select committee report, exonerating Judge Peters of any wrongdoing, was adopted by the House on March 12.

=== Harry Innis ===
On March 21, 1808, a resolution to investigate Judge Innis of the District of Kentucky was introduced to the United States House of Representatives. The resolution was tabled. On March 31, 1808, they tried again and it was adopted by the House. A select committee was appointed to conduct the impeachment investigation, and it submitted a report, absolving the Judge of all wrongdoing, to the House on April 19, 1808.

=== Peter Bruin ===
On April 9, 1808, At the request of the territorial legislature, Mississippi delegate George Poindexter introduced a resolution calling for the appointment of a special committee to prepare articles of impeachment against Presiding Judge Peter Bruin of the Mississippi Territory. The resolution was tabled. On April 18, the resolution was reconsidered and a special committee, chaired by Poindexter, was appointed to investigate the Judge., who was charged with "neglect of duty and drunkenness on the bench."

Bruin resigned on October 12, 1808 as a consequence of the investigation. The House terminated impeachment proceedings, and Bruin died in 1827.

=== Harry Toulmin ===
On December 19, 1811, as a result of an accusatory letter from Judge Harry Toulmin's district (the Washington District of the Mississippi Territory), a resolution was introduced to investigate the judge's conduct. The resolution was tabled. On December 21, 1811, the resolution was withdrawn, and the original accusatory letter of December 16, 1811, was referred to a select committee for further inquiry.

On January 14, 1812, an attempt to disband the investigating select committee was voted down. The select committee submitted a report absolving Judge Toulmin on May 22, 1812. The report was adopted by the House. Then on January 2, 1817, another letter was read before the House outlining charges of misconduct against Judge Toulmin. The letter was referred to the Judiciary Committee for further investigation.

On February 27, 1817, the Judiciary Committee issued a report finding no evidence to support impeachment. The report was adopted by the House, and the Judiciary Committee was disbanded.

=== Van Ness and Tallmadge ===
On April 10, 1818, a resolution was introduced requesting that a special committee be appointed to investigate Judges William P. Van Ness and Matthias B. Tallmadge of the Southern District of New York. The resolution was adopted by the House. Both had been charged with not doing any work. Talmage, claimed that he had so much paperwork left over by his predecessor that he had no time to do anything else, and that his health was so delicate that he needed a long vacation.

On February 17, 1819, the special committee submitted a report to the House recommending no action be taken against either Judge.

=== William Stephens ===
On April 10, 1818, a special committee was appointed to investigate William Stephens of the District of Georgia.

Judge Stevens resigned during the House investigation, and on November 24, the special committee was disbanded.

=== Charles Tait – Circuit Court, Alabama ===
On March 6, 1822, a complaint against Charles Tait of the District of Alabama was received by the House and referred to the Judiciary Committee. A second complaint was presented on December 27. Mr. Moore then proposed a resolution referring the complaint to the Judiciary Committee for further action. Id. at 465. The resolution was adopted. Id. at 468. On January 28, 1823, the Judiciary Committee submitted a report exonerating Judge Tait. No action was taken before the end of the Congressional Session.

On January 26, 1824, the House received another complaint against Judge Tait. This complaint was tabled.

=== Joseph L. Smith – Supreme Court, Territory of Florida ===
On February 3, 1825, Richard K. Call, Delegate from Florida introduced a resolution calling for the Judiciary Committee to investigate Judge Joseph Lee Smith of the Florida Territory's Supreme Court on the charge that he took bribes and kickbacks. The resolution was adopted.

The investigation went on for years, with the last reference to it being in 1830.

=== Buckner Thruston – Circuit Court, DC ===
Circuit Court Judge John Ness sent a memorial to Congress complaining of D.C. Circuit Court Judge Buckner Thruston's official conduct. The memorial was referred to the Judiciary Committee for investigation. On February 28, 1825, the Judiciary Committee submitted its report to the House.

The report recommended no action be taken against the Judge.

On January 30, 1837, William Brent and Richard Coxe sent another memorial to Congress requesting an investigation of Judge Thruston, who was reputed to be a nasty individual and bad judge. The memorial was referred to the Judiciary Committee. On March 3, 1837, the Judiciary Committee submitted its final report to the House. The report contained witness testimony, but no recommendation for or against impeachment.

No other record regarding the disposition of this report has been found in primary or secondary sources. Presumably, no action was taken before the end of the congressional session.

=== Alfred Conkling – Northern District of New York ===
Martha Bradstreet sent a petition to Congress requesting an investigation of Judge Conkling. The petition was referred to the Judiciary Committee to conduct the investigation. On April 3, 1830, the Judiciary Committee submitted its report to the House.

The report recommended no action be taken against Judge Conkling.

A second set of complaints from citizens of New York was submitted to Congress and referred to the Judiciary Committee for investigation. On March 3, 1841, the Judiciary Committee submitted its report to the House.

The report recommended no action be taken against Judge Conkling.

On August 8, 1848, a third memorial requesting an investigation was sent to Congress by Anson Little. The memorial was presented to the House on January 3, 1849, and referred to the Judiciary Committee for further investigation. On February 13, 1849, the Judiciary Committee submitted its report to the House, The report recommended a full investigation of Judge Conkling, who among other things had presided over a lawsuit he had instigated against another party, be conducted by the next Congress.

No action was taken by the next Congress.

=== Benjamin Johnson – Arkansas Territory Superior Court ===
William Cummins sent a memorial to Congress requesting an investigation of Judge Johnson. The memorial was referred to the Judiciary Committee for further action. On February 8, 1833, the Judiciary Committee submitted its report to the House: The report found no evidence to support impeachment. The Judiciary Committee also concluded that a territorial judge was not a civil officer subject to impeachment. The Judiciary Committee then recommended no further action be taken against Judge Johnson.

=== Philip K. Lawrence – Eastern District of Louisiana ===
On January 8, 1839, the House received a petition from Duncan Hennan requesting an investigation of Judge Lawrence. The petition was referred to a select committee for further action. On February 11, the select committee submitted its report, The report recommended Judge Lawrence be impeached.

No action was taken, and the Judge remained on the bench until he died in 1841.

=== John C. Watrous – District of Texas ===
On Feb. 13, 1851, a memo requesting an investigation of Judge Watrous was presented to Congress. The memo, which accused the judge of appearing before himself in court among other things, was referred to the Judiciary Committee. On March 3, the Judiciary Committee submitted its report to the House, which recommended the Judiciary Committee be discharged from further consideration because insufficient time remained in the Congressional Session to complete the investigation. A second memo containing charges against Judge Watrous was sent to the House and referred to the Judiciary Committee. On February 28, 1853, the Judiciary Committee submitted its report to the House. The report recommended impeaching the Judge, but it didn't happen.

Another investigation of Judge Watrous was conducted in the 34th Congress. On February 9, 1857, the Judiciary Committee submitted its report recommending Judge Watrous be impeached. However, no further action was taken until January 15, 1858, when a resolution was introduced allowing the Judiciary Committee to further investigate the matter by calling witnesses. The resolution was adopted by the House.

On December 9, 1858, the Judiciary Committee submitted two reports to the House. The majority report recommended Judge Watrous be impeached. The minority, however, found insufficient evidence to warrant impeachment. On December 15, 1858, by a vote of 111 to 97 refused to impeach, finding insufficient evidence to justify the action. This was one of the very few times that the Full House has refused to impeach a Judge after the House Judiciary Committee has recommended a trial in the Senate.

They tried again in 1860, and again the House Judiciary Committee voted out articles of impeachment. However, Texas had seceded from the Union by this time, and in any case the House never got around to it by the time it expired on March 4, 1861.

=== Thomas Irwin – Western District of Pennsylvania ===
During the 35th Congress, 2nd Session, the Judiciary Committee conducted an investigation of Judge Irwin. On January 13, 1859, a resolution authorizing witnesses to be called was adopted by the House.

On January 28, the Judiciary Committee informed the House that Judge Irwin had resigned, and the House voted to discharge the Judiciary Committee from further investigation.

=== Charles T. Sherman – Northern District of Ohio ===
On February 22, 1873, Rep. Roberts introduced a resolution to investigate Judge Sherman (R). The resolution was adopted and referred to the Judiciary Committee. and on March 3, the Judiciary Committee submitted a report recommending further investigation of him in the next Congress, and asking to be discharged from further consideration of the matter.

Rep. Potter attempted to persuade the House to consider an impeachment resolution instead of the committee report, but his attempt failed.

=== Richard Busteed – District of Alabama ===
On December 15, 1873, Mr. E. R. Hoar introduced a resolution to investigate Judge Busteed's conduct. The resolution was referred to the Judiciary Committee. 1 On December 17, 1873, the House passed a resolution granting subpoena power to the Judiciary Committee. On June 20, 1874, the Judiciary Committee submitted its report and resolutions for impeachment to the House. No action was taken before the end of the congressional session. Busteed resigned before the full House could vote on the recommendation. Representatives Butler and Wilson emphasized the revived (previously settled by Blount in 1799) but still-minority position that resignation was no bar to later impeachment, yet voted with the rest of the committee to terminate proceedings. On January 7, 1875, sometime after Judge Busteed's resignation, the House Judiciary Committee introduced a resolution calling for the Judge's impeachment.

The resolution did not pass. However, in the next (44th) Congress, a majority of House voted to impeach Belknap despite his having resigned.

=== Edward Durell – District of Louisiana ===
On December 17, 1873, Mr. Wilson introduced a resolution to investigate Judge Durell. The resolution was referred to the Judiciary Committee.

On January 7, 1875, following Judge Durell's resignation, Mr. Wilson made a motion to table the resolution and relieve the Judiciary Committee of its investigation. His motion carried.

=== William F. Story – Western District of Arkansas ===
On February 26, 1874, Rep. James G. Blaine introduced charges against William F. Story (R). These charges were referred to the Judiciary Committee, prompting Judge Story to resign.

The case was never heard of again.

=== Henry W. Blodgett – Northern District of West Virginia ===
On January 7, 1879, Rep. Harrison offered a resolution to investigate Judge Blodgett.). The resolution was referred to the Judiciary Committee.

On March 3, 1879, the Judiciary Committee reported back to the House, recommending no impeachment proceedings against Judge Blodgett. A resolution to table actions against the Judge was introduced and adopted by the House.

=== Samuel B. Axtell – New Mexico Territory Supreme Court ===
Samuel Axtell (D) was alleged to be the most corrupt politician in the Old West, appointed in 1882.

Chief Judge Axtell resigned in May 1885.

=== Alexander "Aleck" Boarman – Western District of Louisiana ===
On April 1, 1890, Rep. William C. Oates of Alabama introduced a resolution to impeach Judge Boarman was sent to the Judiciary Committee. No primary record of this resolution could be found. However, on February 17, 1891, the Judiciary Committee referred to this initial resolution when it introduced an impeachment resolution against the Judge. The House printed and recommitted the resolution to the Judiciary Committee. Two days later, the Judiciary Committee reintroduced a resolution to impeach Judge Boarman. The House agreed to consider the resolution on February 20 at 2:00 p.m. No such action was taken. So, on the 28th, the resolution was again called up for consideration. The vote on the resolution was postponed until the evening session of the House. Again, the intended action did not occur.

On January 30, 1892, the old impeachment resolution was tabled and a new resolution calling for further investigation of Judge Boarman was adopted and referred to the Judiciary Committee. The Judiciary Committee reported back to the House on June 1.

A resolution was passed discharging the Judiciary Committee from further action against the Judge, and the committee report and accompanying evidence was tabled.

=== James G. Jenkins – Seventh Circuit ===
On February 5, 1894, Mr. McGann introduced a resolution to investigate Judge Jenkins. The resolution was referred to the Judiciary Committee. 26 Cong. Rec. 1922 (1894). On March 2, 1894, the Judiciary Committee submitted a report recommending an investigation of the Judge. Id. at 2533–34. On March 6, 1894, Mr. Boatner introduced a resolution to adopt the committee report and to begin the investigation. The resolution was adopted by the House. Id. at 2629. On June 8, 1894, the Judiciary Committee submitted its report of the investigation to the House. The report was referred to the House Calendar. Id. at 5994

No other record regarding the disposition of this report has been found in primary or secondary sources. Presumably, no action was taken before the end of the congressional session.

=== Augustus Ricks – Northern District of Ohio ===
The Central Labor Union of Cleveland, Ohio, sent a memorial to Congress charging Judge Ricks (R) with professional misconduct. The memorial was referred to the Judiciary Committee for a preliminary investigation of the charges. On August 8, 1894, the Judiciary Committee submitted a report recommending a full investigation of Judge Ricks be conducted. No other record regarding the disposition of this report has been found in primary or secondary sources. Presumably, no action was taken before the end of the congressional session. On January 7, 1895, Mr. Johnson offered another resolution calling for an investigation into charges against Judge Ricks. The resolution was adopted and referred to the Judiciary Committee.

The Judiciary Committee recommended impeachment and reported its findings to the House on January 25, 1895. The committee report was referred to the House calendar and ordered printed.

=== Lebbeus R. Wilfley – U.S. Court for China ===
In 1906, the U.S. Congress established a special court for the "district of China", based in the Shanghai International Settlement which had vice-regal powers of arrest and imprisonment. With only one judge, the former Attorney General of the Philippines, and no obligation to follow the strictures of the constitution or local law, there were many complaints by American expatriates, especially one by Lorrin A. Thurston, former Attorney General of the Territory of Hawaii, who charged that Judge Wilfley had voided a will by a person leaving some of his money to the Catholic Church because of his prejudice against it. On February 20, 1908, Representative George E. Waldo introduced articles of impeachment against Wilfley and the resolution was referred to the Judiciary Committee. Leaving the court in chaos, Wilfley traveled halfway around the world to attend the hearings in Washington, D.C.

On May 8, the Judiciary Committee submitted a report, H.R. Rep. No. 60-1626, to the House recommending against impeachment, but by the time Wilfley got back to Shanghai, the situation was so poisoned, he resigned and returned to the U.S. for good.

=== Cornelius H. Hanford – U.S. Circuit Judge, Western District of Washington ===
On June 7, 1912, Berger introduced a resolution to investigate Judge Cornelius H. Hanford. The resolution was referred to the Judiciary Committee.

Hanford resigned.

=== Emory Speer – Southern District of Georgia ===
On August 26, 1913, Rep. Clayton offered a resolution, H.R. Res. 234, to investigate Judge Speer. The resolution was referred to the Rules Committee. Id. at 3795. However, following an objection from the floor, the resolution was held over for consideration until August 27, 1913, at which time it was amended and adopted A Select Subcommittee of the Judiciary Committee conducted the investigation. On October 2, 1914, after reviewing the Subcommittee's findings, the Judiciary Committee submitted a report, to the House. The report was referred to the House Calendar.

The report, which recommended no further action be taken against Judge Speer, was considered and agreed to by the House on October 21.

=== Daniel Thew Wright – Supreme Court of the District of Columbia ===
On March 21, 1914, Mr. Park introduced an impeachment resolution, H.R. Res. 446, against Judge Wright. The resolution was referred to the Judiciary Committee. On April 10, 1914, the Judiciary Committee submitted a report, to the House. The report recommended further investigation and authorized the Judiciary Committee to use Subcommittees as needed. The report was adopted and referred to the Judiciary Committee for further action.

On March 3, 1915, the House agreed with the Judiciary Committee's final report recommending no further action, and discharged the Judiciary Committee from any further investigation of Judge Wright.

=== Alston G. Dayton – Northern District of West Virginia ===
On May 11, 1914, Mr. Neely introduced a resolution, H.R. Res. 512, calling for the investigation of Judge Dayton. The resolution was sent to the Rules Committee. On June 12, 1914, after no further action was taken, Mr. Neely introduced a second resolution, H.R. Res. 541, to investigate impeachment charges against the Judge. This resolution was also sent to the Judiciary Committee. On February 9, 1915, the report, of a Select Subcommittee of the House Judiciary Committee was considered by the House. The House followed the report's recommendation and adopted a resolution authorizing the Judiciary Committee to investigate the Judge. The Judiciary Committee then submitted its report, to the House on March 3, 1915.

The report, recommending no further action against Judge Dayton, was adopted.

=== Kenesaw Mountain Landis – Northern District of Illinois ===
In 1920 Judge Landis left the bench to become Commissioner of Baseball, but neglected to resign and continued to receive his salary, which offended many people. On February 2, 1921, Mr. Welty introduced a resolution, H.R. Res. 665, to investigate the conduct of Judge Landis. The resolution was referred to the Rules Committee. On February 14, 1921, Mr. Welty introduced actual impeachment charges against Judge Landis. These charges were referred to the House Judiciary Committee for investigation.

On March 2, 1921, the Judiciary Committee submitted a report, to the House, and it was referred to the House Calendar. The report recommended a complete investigation be undertaken by the 67th Congress. No action was taken before the end of the Congressional Session. However, on October 17, 1921, Judge Landis was condemned for his actions in a letter from the American Bar Association.

This condemnation letter was referred to the Senate Judiciary Committee.

=== William E. Baker – Northern District of West Virginia ===
On May 22, 1924, a resolution, H.R. Res. 325, to investigate Judge Baker was introduced. Some time earlier the Judiciary Committee had received information concerning misconduct by Judge Baker, and appointed a Subcommittee to review the material. After this review, the Subcommittee recommended a full-scale investigation. The resolution was adopted by the House and referred to the Judiciary Committee for further action. A Select Subcommittee of the House Judiciary Committee was given charge of the investigation. (There is record of the Select Subcommittee obtaining funding for a stenographer on June 7, 1924.) The final Judiciary Committee report, recommended against impeaching Judge Baker. The report by Mr. Dwyer was referred to the House Calendar on February 10, 1925.

No action was taken before the end of the congressional session.

=== George W. English – Eastern District of Illinois ===
On January 13, 1925, Mr. Hawes introduced a resolution, H.R. Res. 402, requesting the Judiciary Committee conduct an investigation of Judge English. The resolution was referred to the Rules Committee. Then on February 3, 1925, Mr. Snell made a motion to refer House Resolution 402 from the Rules Committee to the Judiciary Committee. The motion carried.

On February 10, 1925, Mr. Graham introduced a joint resolution, H.R.J. Res. 347, calling for an investigation of Judge English. The resolution was referred to the Judiciary Committee. The resolution was signed by the President on March 4, 1925. A special committee, consisting of members of the House Judiciary Committee, was then appointed to conduct the investigation. On December 19, 1925, the special committee submitted its report. The report was subsequently referred to the Judiciary Committee, which continued the investigation. Judge English testified before the Judiciary Committee on January 12, 1926.

On March 25, 1926, the Judiciary Committee submitted its report, H.R. Rep. No. 69-653, and articles of impeachment against Judge English. The next day a minority report was printed in the record. On March 30, 1926, the House began debate on the articles of impeachment. On April 1, 1926, the articles of impeachment were adopted. The Senate considered the articles of impeachment on April 23, 1926, and the impeachment trial began with Judge English's answer to the articles on May 3, 1926. House managers then requested time to prepare a response to Judge English. On March 5, 1926, the Senate set November 10 as the date for the trial to resume.

On December 11, 1926, the House took note of Judge English's resignation and requested the Senate drop the impeachment proceedings. The Senate accepted the House recommendation and ended the proceedings on December 13, 1926

John T. Rogers of St. Louis Post-Dispatch won the 1927 Pulitzer Prize for Reporting with his coverage of the inquiry leading to English's impeachment.

=== Frank Cooper – Northern District of New York ===
On January 28, 1927, Congressman Fiorello H. La Guardia brought impeachment charges against Judge Cooper. The charges were referred to the Judiciary Committee for investigation. On March 2, 1927, the Judiciary Committee submitted its report, H.R. Rep. No. 69-2299, recommending no impeachment action be taken against the Judge.

This report was referred to the House Calendar, and the next day a resolution, H.R. Res. 450, adopting the committee report and recommending no impeachment action be taken against the Judge, was passed by the House.

=== Grover Moscowitz – U.S. District Judge, Eastern District of New York ===
On March 4, 1929, a joint resolution, H.R.J. Res. 431, calling for the investigation of Judge Moscowitz was signed by the President. 70 Cong. Rec. 5227 (1929). The resolution created a Select Subcommittee of the House Judiciary Committee to conduct the investigation. Id. at 4839. Following this investigation, the Judiciary Committee submitted a report, H.R. Rep. No. 70-1106, to the House criticizing Judge Moscowitz, but refused to recommend impeachment.

No action was taken before the end of the congressional session.

=== Francis A. Winslow – Southern District of New York ===
On April 15, 1929, Congressman Fiorello H. La Guardia introduced a resolution, H.R. Res. 12, to investigate Judge Winslow. The resolution was referred to the Judiciary Committee. On December 20, 1929, the Judiciary Committee submitted a report, H.R. Rep. No. 71–84, recommending the investigation cease due to Judge Winslow's resignation.

A resolution, H.R. Res. 110, adopting the committee's report recommending the investigation cease due to Judge Winslow's resignation was passed by the House.

=== Harry Anderson – Western District of Tennessee ===
On March 12, 1930, La Guardia introduced a resolution, H.R. Res. 184, requesting that the Attorney General send the Judiciary Committee any available information on Judge Anderson's conduct. The resolution was sent to the Judiciary Committee. On June 2, 1930, a resolution from the Judiciary Committee, H.R. Res. 191, was introduced. The resolution called for a special committee, consisting of five members of the House Judiciary Committee, to be appointed to inquire into Judge Anderson's conduct. The resolution was referred to the "Committee of the Whole House on the State of the Union" and agreed to by the House on June 13, 1930.

On February 18, 1931, the Judiciary Committee submitted a report, H.R. Rep. No. 71-2714, of their findings, and introduced a resolution, H.R. Res. 362, stating insufficient grounds existed for impeachment. The resolution was adopted.

=== James Lowell – District of Massachusetts ===
On April 26, 1933, Mr. Smith introduced a resolution, H.R. Res. 120, authorizing the Judiciary Committee to investigate Judge Lowell. The resolution was adopted.

On November 30, 1933, during the investigation, Judge Lowell died.

=== Judge Lindley, James Wilkerson, and Judge Woodward – Northern District of Illinois ===
On June 12, 1933, Mr. Cellers introduced a resolution, H.R. Res. 145, to investigate the "matter of appointments, conduct, proceedings, and acts of receivers, trustees, and referees in bankruptcy." The resolution was referred to the Rules Committee for further action.

Some judges were implicated, and their impeachment discussed, but were later exonerated.

=== Joseph Molyneaux – District of Minnesota ===
On January 22, 1934, Mr. Shoemaker introduced a resolution, H.R. Res. 233, authorizing the Judiciary Committee to investigate Judge Molyneaux. The resolution was adopted and referred to the Judiciary Committee. When no action was taken, Mr. Shoemaker introduced another resolution on April 20, 1934. This resolution contained impeachment charges against Judge Molyneaux, and was also referred to the Judiciary Committee. Presumably, the resolutions died in committee.

=== Samuel Alschuler – Seventh Circuit ===
On May 7, 1935, Rep. Everett Dirksen offered a resolution, H.R. Res. 214, to investigate impeachment charges against Judge Alschuler. The resolution was referred to the Judiciary Committee. A week later, the House adopted a resolution, H.R. Res. 220, granting the Judiciary Committee authority to hold hearings.

=== Albert Johnson – Middle District of Pennsylvania ===
On February 15, 1945, a resolution, H.R. Res. 138, authorizing the Judiciary Committee to investigate impeachment charges against Judge Johnson (and Judge Watson, see below) was adopted by the House. The investigation of Judge Johnson was conducted at both the committee and subcommittee level. (Referenced in a speech by Richard Russell) .). On July 3, 1945, during the Judiciary Committee investigation, Judge Johnson resigned. On July 14, he was called to testify before the Judiciary Committee. Following a poor performance by the Judge during cross examination, the Judge relinquished his retirement salary and withdrew as a witness, thereby mooting the entire process.

The report of the House Judiciary Committee the following year stated that had Johnson not resigned, he would have definitely been impeached.

=== Albert L. Watson – Middle District of Pennsylvania ===
The House Judiciary Committee voted to end the impeachment investigation against Judge Watson on September 20, 1945, and he went on to serve until his death in the 1950s. This would be the last serious impeachment investigation for nearly a quarter-century.

=== William O. Douglas – United States Supreme Court ===
There were two attempts to remove Associate Justice William O. Douglas from office; both of them failed.

==== 1953 ====
On June 17, 1953, infuriated by Douglas' brief stay of execution of Julius and Ethel Rosenberg Rep. Wheeler introduced a resolution, H.R. Res. 290, impeaching Justice Douglas. It was referred to the Judiciary Committee to investigate the charges. The next day, the Judiciary Committee appointed a Special Subcommittee to conduct the investigation. There was a hearing, and on July 7, the committee voted to end the investigation.

No further action was taken.

==== 1970 ====
Justice Douglas was fully committed to his causes. However, because of difficult financial circumstances, he was also forced to maintain a busy speaking and publishing" schedule to supplement his income. Never a wealthy man, Douglas became severely burdened financially due to a bitter divorce and settlement with his first wife. He only sank deeper into financial difficulties as settlements with his second and third wives essentially consumed his entire salary as an Associate Justice of the Supreme Court.

Douglas's steps to supplement his income as a result of his financial situation also included the unusual move of becoming president of the Parvin Foundation. While his efforts on behalf of the Parvin Foundation were legitimate, his ties with the foundation (which was financed by the sale of the infamous Flamingo Hotel by casino financier and foundation founder Albert Parvin), became a prime target for then-House Minority Leader Gerald R. Ford. Besides being personally disgusted by Douglas's allegedly illicit lifestyle, Representative Ford was also mindful that Douglas protégé Abe Fortas was forced to resign because of ties to a foundation similar to Parvin. Fortas would later say that he "resigned to save Douglas," thinking that the dual investigations into them would stop with his resignation.

Some scholars, have argued that Ford's impeachment attempt was politically motivated. Those who support this contention note Ford's well-known disappointment with the Senate over the failed nominations of Clement Haynsworth and G. Harrold Carswell to succeed Fortas. Thus, in April 1970, Congressman Ford moved to impeach Douglas in an attempt to hit back at the Senate.

On April 15, 1970, at the instigation of Rep. Gerald Ford, Rep. Jacobs began a second attempt to impeach Justice Douglas. His resolution to impeach the Justice, H.R. Res. 920, was referred to the Judiciary Committee for investigation. The next day seven resolutions, H.R. Res. 922, 923, 924, 925, 926, 927, and 928, requesting an investigation of Justice Douglas were introduced on the floor of the House. All of the resolutions sought the creation of a select committee to conduct the investigation, and all were referred to the Rules Committee for further action. On April 20, 1970, Mr. Wyman introduced resolution, H.R. Res. 936, to investigate Justice Douglas. This resolution was referred to the Rules Committee. On April 28, 1970, Mr. Gooding introduced resolution to investigate Justice Douglas. This resolution was also sent to the Rules Committee. On April 21, 1970, a Special Subcommittee of the House Judiciary Committee was appointed to conduct an investigation under House Resolution 920. It issued a progress report on June 20, 1970.

Despite careful maneuvering by House Judiciary Chairman Emanuel Celler, and an apparent lack of proof of any criminal conduct on the part of Douglas (efforts by Attorney General John N. Mitchell and the Nixon administration to gather evidence to the contrary notwithstanding), Congressman Ford moved forward in the first major attempt to impeach a Supreme Court Justice in the modern era.

The hearings began in late April 1970. U.S. Representative Ford was the main witness; he attacked Douglas's "liberal opinions", his "defense of the 'filthy' film I Am Curious (Yellow), and his ties with the aforementioned Parvin. Additionally, Douglas was criticized for accepting $350 for an article he wrote on folk music in the magazine Avant Garde. The magazine's publisher had served a prison sentence for the distribution of another magazine in 1966 that had been deemed pornographic. Describing Douglas' article, Ford stated, "The article itself is not pornographic, although it praises the lusty, lurid, and risqué along with the social protest of left-wing folk singers". Ford also attacked Douglas for his article in Evergreen magazine, which was infamous for its proclivity for pictures of naked women. The Republican congressmen, however, refused to give the majority Democrats copies of the magazines, prompting Congressman Wayne Hays to remark "Has anybody read the article – or is everybody over there who has a magazine just looking at the pictures?"

When it became clear that the impeachment proceedings would be unsuccessful, they were brought to a close, and no public vote on the matter was taken.

The final report of the Special Subcommittee found no cause for impeachment and recommended no further action be taken. Mr. Wyman criticized this report on December 17, 1970. On December 21, 1970, Mr. Dennis, a member of the Judiciary Committee, criticized his Committee for refusing to even bring the Subcommittee report to a vote.

=== Alfred Murrah, Stephen Chandler, and Luther Bohanon ===
Luther Bohanon of the Eastern, Northern, and Western Districts of Oklahoma; Stephen Chandler of the Western District of Oklahoma; and Alfred P. Murrah of the 10th Circuit (which sits in Oklahoma) had been feuding so much that it was becoming a national scandal, and thus, many people in Oklahoma demanded their impeachment to put a halt to it. Thus, on February 21, 1966, Congressman Harold R. Gross requested an investigation of these three Oklahoma judges. A resolution to investigate, H.R. Res. 739, was adopted the next day and sent to the House Judiciary Committee which formed an "Ad Hoc Special Subcommittee on Judicial Behavior" for further action.

The investigation, which lasted until 1968, found that the so-called Chandler Mess was reprehensible, but not criminal.

=== Abe Fortas – United States Supreme Court ===
Associate Justice Abe Fortas had accepted a $20,000 retainer from the family foundation of Wall Street financier Louis Wolfson, a friend and former client, in January 1966. Fortas signed a contract with Wolfson's foundation; in return for unspecified advice, it was to pay Fortas $20,000 a year for the rest of Fortas's life (and then pay his widow for the rest of her life). Wolfson was under investigation for securities violations at the time and it is alleged that he expected that his arrangement with Fortas would help him stave off criminal charges or help him secure a presidential pardon. Wolfson did ask Fortas to help him secure a pardon from President Lyndon B. Johnson, which Fortas claimed that he did not do, and he returned the retainer, but not until Wolfson had been indicted twice. Wolfson was convicted in 1967 of selling unregistered shares, and then the following year he was convicted of perjury and obstruction of justice in connection with an Securities and Exchange Commission investigation into a company he chaired. Wolfson served a year in federal prison following that second conviction. Later, when a request to review Wolfson's conviction came before the Court (which it refused), Fortas recused himself.

Early in 1969, the new Nixon administration became aware of the Wolfson deal when a Life reporter began investigating the story; FBI director J. Edgar Hoover also mentioned a "tax dodge" Fortas had entered into with other judges, and President Richard Nixon concluded Fortas should be "off of there." When Chief Justice Earl Warren was informed of the incident by the new Attorney General John N. Mitchell, he persuaded Fortas to resign to protect the reputation of the Court and avoid lengthy impeachment proceedings, which were in their preliminary stages; Fortas' judicial reputation was also affected by the previous Johnson consultation and American University scandals. Justice Hugo Black also urged Fortas to resign, but when Fortas said it would "kill" his wife, Black changed his mind and urged Fortas not to resign. Soon after impeachment proceedings formally began with a resolution introduced by Rep. H. R. Gross (R-Iowa), Fortas decided resignation would be best for him and for his wife's legal career, and told his colleagues.

He resigned from the Court on May 15, 1969. William J. Brennan, Jr. later said, "We were just stunned." Fortas later said he "resigned to save Douglas," another justice who was being investigated for a similar scandal at the same time.

=== Otto Kerner – Seventh Circuit ===
Kerner had been convicted of bribery, and with all his appeals exhausted, he resigned in July 1974 after being told that the House Judiciary Committee would vote to impeach him immediately after they were done with proceedings against President Richard Nixon.

=== Frank J. Battisti – Northern District of Ohio ===
On January 24, 1978, U.S. Representative John M. Ashbrook introduced an impeachment resolution, H.R. Res. 966, against Judge Battisti. The resolution was referred to the Judiciary Committee., where given the judge's sterling record, it died in committee. However, he tried again on January 5, 1981 with H.RES.12, where it died in committee, again.

=== Nauman Scott – Western District of Louisiana ===
On Feb 19, 1981, U.S. Representative Lawrence P. McDonald introduced an impeachment resolution, H.R. Res. 61. against Judge Scott, over the issue of court mandated busing. The bill was referred to the House Judiciary committee, where it died.

=== William Wayne Justice – Eastern District of Texas ===
On June 24, 1981, U.S. Representative Ron Paul introduced an impeachment resolution, H.R. Res. 168, against Judge Justice.

=== 140 federal judges ===
Atkins v. U.S. was an unsuccessful attempt to force the Government to address the destructive effect of inflation on the judiciary during the period 1969–1975, when the value of the dollar, measured by the Consumer Price Index, decreased by 34%, and Congress failed to provide increases to protect judges' purchasing power.

On March 2, 1976, U.S. Representative Andrew Jacobs, Jr. introduced an impeachment resolution against Atkins and 139 other federal judges involved in the above-mentioned dispute. The resolution was referred to the Judiciary Committee and nothing was done. Jacobs introduced a second impeachment resolution against the same judges in a little more than a month.

The resolution was referred to the Judiciary Committee, where it too, died.

=== Manuel L. Real – Central District of California ===
On July 17, 2006, U.S. Representative Jim Sensenbrenner (R-WI), Chairman of the House Judiciary Committee, introduced H.RES.916, calling for an investigation of Judge Manuel Real and consider impeaching him. The House Judiciary Committee's Subcommittee on Courts, the Internet and Intellectual Property subsequently held a hearing on Real's conduct on September 21.

It did not agree to recommend impeachment.

=== Jay Bybee – Ninth Circuit ===
Representative Jerrold Nadler (D-NY), a senior member of the House Judiciary Committee on April 20, 2009, called for the impeachment of Judge Jay Bybee, as Bybee was one of the authors of torture memos written by senior Justice Department lawyers during the Bush Administration. In July of that year, Bybee started a legal defense fund in anticipation of impeachment. In February 2010, after more than a year's delay, the Department of Justice released the Office of Professional Responsibility's report on whether government lawyers who wrote these torture memos violated professional ethics and found what Bybee had done was legal.

No impeachment resolution was ever introduced in the House of Representatives.

=== Mark Fuller – Middle District of Alabama ===
Judge Mark Fuller was arrested on August 9, 2014 after his wife called police and reported her husband was drunk and hitting her while they were at an Atlanta hotel. He later accepted a plea deal that will allow his record to be expunged if he completes a counseling program. The Eleventh Circuit Court of Appeals reassigned all of his cases to other judges for the time being.

The plea deal displeased U.S. Representative Terri Sewell (D-AL), who demanded Fuller resign by November 12, 2014. When he did not, she sent a letter to the chairman and ranking Democrat on the House Judiciary Committee to instigate impeachment proceedings. The process was put on hold while the Judicial Conference of the United States investigated the matter. It announced that he had indeed committed impeachable offenses.

Fuller said he would resign on August 1, 2015, but then said he might change his mind. The House Judiciary Committee stated he would indeed be impeached if he did not resign by the date he originally announced, which he did

=== Brett Kavanaugh – United States Supreme Court ===
During the U.S. Senate Judiciary Committee hearings in 2018 on the nomination of Brett Kavanaugh to become an Associate Justice of the Supreme Court, several women accused him of sexual misconduct while in college. The nomination was sent to the Senate floor by a party-line vote and he was confirmed by a vote of 50 to 48.

83 ethics complaints were brought against Kavanaugh in regard to his conduct during his U.S. Supreme Court confirmation hearings. Chief Justice John Roberts appointed a special federal panel of judges to investigate the complaints. In December 2018, the judicial panel dismissed all 83 ethics complaints, concluding that while the complaints "are serious" there is no existing authority that allows lower court judges to investigate or discipline Supreme Court Justices.

Several books on the hearings came out in mid-2019 and the disapproval over some of the revelations elicited calls for impeachment. On September 18, 2019, Representative Ayanna Pressley (D-Mass.) introduced a resolution, H.Res.560, which was subsequently referred to the United States House Committee on Rules. As of yet, no action has been taken on this resolution.
