= United States House of Representatives Calendar =

The House Calendar is a calendar in the United States House of Representatives that schedules major bills which do not involve raising revenue or public expenditure of funds. The calendar can also be defined as a list of all bills reported from committee and eligible for floor action, except bills pertaining to taxation and spending.

== Union Calendar ==
The Union Calendar is a separate calendar in the United States House of Representatives that schedules bills involving money issues. It arose from the requirement in Article One of the United States Constitution that all revenue bills originate in the House of Representatives. To meet that requirement, Rule XIII, clause 1(a) of the House Rules establishes

A Calendar of the Committee of the Whole House on the state of the Union, to which shall be referred public bills and public resolutions raising revenue, involving a tax or charge on the people, directly or indirectly making appropriations of money or property or requiring such appropriations to be made, authorizing payments out of appropriations already made, releasing any liability to the United States for money or property, or referring a claim to the Court of Claims.

The majority of modern bills that are reported will contain provisions for public expenditures of funds. Therefore, more bills reported by House committees are placed on the Union Calendar and committed to the Committee of the Whole than are placed on other calendars.

== See also ==
- Reconciliation (United States Congress)
- Committee of the Whole (United States House of Representatives)
- Resolution (law)
