= Premiership of Tony Blair =

Period of the Government of the United Kingdom from 1997 to 2007

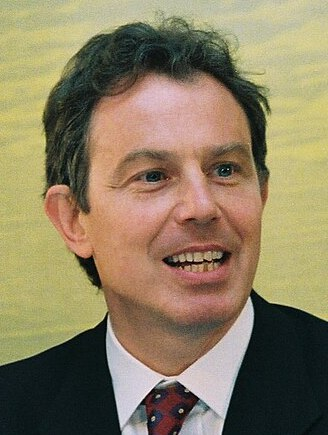
- Blair in 1997
- Premiership of Tony Blair; 2 May 1997 – 27 June 2007
- Monarch: Elizabeth II
- Cabinet: First Blair ministry; Second Blair ministry; Third Blair ministry
- Party: Labour
- Election: 1997; 2001; 2005
- Seat: 10 Downing Street
- Coat of Arms of HM Government

Tony Blair's tenure as Prime Minister of the United Kingdom began on 2 May 1997 when he accepted an invitation from Queen Elizabeth II to form a government, succeeding John Major of the Conservative Party, and ended on 27 June 2007 upon his resignation. As prime minister, Blair also served simultaneously as First Lord of the Treasury, Minister for the Civil Service, and Leader of the Labour Party. He and Gordon Brown both extensively used the New Labour branding while in office, which was presented as the brand of a newly reformed party that had altered Clause IV and endorsed market economics. He is the second-longest-serving prime minister in post-war British history after Margaret Thatcher, the longest-serving Labour politician to have held the office, and the first and only person to date to lead the party to three consecutive general election victories.

Blair became the youngest prime minister of the 20th century after his party won a landslide victory in the 1997 general election, with Labour becoming the largest party in the House of Commons. During his first term, Blair enacted constitutional reforms and significantly increased public spending on healthcare and education while also introducing controversial market-based reforms in these areas. In addition, Blair saw the introduction of a minimum wage, tuition fees for higher education, constitutional reform such as devolution in Scotland and Wales, an extensive expansion of LGBT+ rights in the UK, and significant progress in the Northern Ireland peace process with the passing of the landmark Good Friday Agreement. On foreign policy, Blair oversaw British interventions in Kosovo in 1999 and Sierra Leone in 2000, which were generally perceived to be successful.

Blair won a second term after Labour won a second landslide victory in the 2001 general election. Three months into his second term, Blair's premiership was shaped by the 9/11 terrorist attacks, resulting in the start of the war on terror. Blair supported the United States by ensuring that the British Armed Forces participated in the War in Afghanistan to overthrow the Taliban, destroy al-Qaeda, and capture Osama bin Laden. Blair also supported the 2003 invasion of Iraq and had the British Armed Forces participate in the Iraq War, on the inaccurate beliefs that Saddam Hussein's regime possessed weapons of mass destruction and developed ties with al-Qaeda. The invasion of Iraq was particularly controversial, as it attracted widespread public opposition and 139 of Blair's own MPs opposed it. As a result, he faced criticism over the policy itself and the circumstances of the decision. The Iraq Inquiry report of 2016 gave a damning assessment of Blair's role in the Iraq War. As the casualties of the Iraq War mounted, Blair was accused of misleading Parliament, and his popularity dropped dramatically.

Blair won a third term after Labour won a third election victory in 2005, in part thanks to the UK's strong economic performance, but with a substantially reduced majority due to the UK's involvement in the Iraq War. During his third term, Blair pushed for more systemic public sector reform and brokered a settlement to restore powersharing to Northern Ireland. He had a surge in popularity at the time of terrorist bombings of London of July 2005, but by the Spring of 2006 faced significant difficulties, most notably with scandals over failures by the Home Office to deport illegal immigrants. The Afghanistan and Iraq wars continued, and in 2006, Blair announced he would resign within a year. He resigned the party leadership on 24 June 2007 and as prime minister on 27 June, and was succeeded by Gordon Brown, his chancellor.

In 2003, Blair became the longest continuously-serving Labour prime minister, surpassing Clement Attlee's six-year term from 1945 to 1951. In 2005, Blair became the longest-serving Labour prime minister in British history, surpassing the near eight-year total Harold Wilson served over his two terms in office. In 2009, Blair was awarded the Presidential Medal of Freedom by George W. Bush. He was knighted by Queen Elizabeth II as a Knight Companion of the Garter in 2021. At various points in his premiership, Blair was among both the most popular and most unpopular figures in UK history. As prime minister, he achieved the highest recorded approval ratings during his first few years in office, but also one of the lowest such ratings during and after the Iraq War. Blair is usually rated as above average in historical rankings and public opinion of British prime ministers.

== Labour leadership bid ==
On 21 July 1994, Shadow Home Secretary Tony Blair won the Labour Party leadership election to succeed John Smith, defeating John Prescott and Margaret Beckett with an overall result of 57.0%. Prescott won the deputy leadership poll, and went on to become Deputy Prime Minister during Blair's premiership. Beckett would also serve both in the Shadow Cabinet and then the Cabinet throughout Blair's term as leader, eventually becoming the last of the three Foreign Secretaries of the Blair ministries.

It has long been rumoured a deal was struck between Blair and Shadow Chancellor Gordon Brown at the former Granita restaurant in Islington, in which Blair promised to give Brown control of economic policy in return for Brown not standing against him in the leadership election. Whether this is true or not, the relationship between Blair and Brown was central to the fortunes of New Labour, and they mostly remained united in public, despite reported serious private rifts.

Blair's tenure as leader began with a historic rebranding of the party, who began to use the campaign label New Labour to distance itself from previous Labour politics and the traditional idea of socialism. Despite opposition from Labour's left-wing, he abolished Clause IV, the party's formal commitment to the nationalisation of the economy, weakened trade union influence in the party, and committed to the free market and the European Union.

Blair inherited the Labour leadership at a time when the party was ascendant over the Conservatives in the opinion polls, since the Conservative government's reputation in monetary policy declined due to the Black Wednesday economic disaster of September 1992. Blair's election as leader saw Labour support surge higher still in spite of the continuing economic recovery and fall in unemployment that the Conservative government led by John Major had overseen since the end of the 1990–1992 recession. The New Labour brand was developed to regain trust from the electorate and to portray a departure from their traditional socialist policies which was criticised for its breaking of election promises and its links between trade unions and the state, and to communicate the party's modernisation to the public.

At the 1996 Labour Party Conference, Blair stated that his three top priorities on coming to office were "education, education, and education". In 1996, the manifesto New Labour, New Life for Britain was published, which set out the party's new "Third Way" centrist approach to policy, and was presented as the brand of a newly reformed party that had altered Clause IV and endorsed market economics. In May 1995, Labour had achieved considerable success in the local and European elections, and had won four by-elections. For Blair, these achievements were a source of optimism, as they indicated that the Conservatives were in decline. Virtually every opinion poll since late-1992 put Labour ahead of the Conservatives with enough support to form an overall majority.

== First term (May 1997 – June 2001) ==
=== 1997 general election landslide victory ===
Aided by the unpopularity of John Major's Conservative government (itself deeply divided over the European Union), Blair led the Labour Party to victory in the 1997 general election (its largest landslide general election victory in history), ending eighteen years of Conservative Party government, with the heaviest Conservative defeat since 1906. Blair became the prime minister of the United Kingdom on 2 May 1997. After Major tendered his resignation to Queen Elizabeth II, Blair was invited by the Queen to form a new government and become prime minister.

=== Entering government ===
After accepting the Queen's invitation to form a government, Blair and his wife Cherie Blair were driven from Buckingham Palace to Downing Street. Blair stopped the car on the way back from the palace and went on an unprecedented walkabout outside Downing Street to meet cheering crowds.

In his first speech as prime minister, Blair paid tribute to Major, saying "John Major's dignity and courage over the last few days and the manner of his leaving, is the mark of the man. I am pleased to pay tribute to him." On his landslide victory, Blair said "As I stand here before 10 Downing Street I know all too well the huge responsibility that is upon me and the great trust that the British people have placed in me. I know well what this country has voted for today. It is a mandate for New Labour and I say to the people of this country – we ran for office as New Labour, we will govern as New Labour."

Later that day Blair announced the leading members of his first cabinet, with Gordon Brown being appointed Chancellor of the Exchequer and John Prescott being appointed deputy prime minister.

=== Independence for the Bank of England ===
Immediately after becoming chancellor, Brown gave the Bank of England the power to set the UK base rate of interest autonomously, as agreed in 1992 in the Maastricht Treaty. This decision was popular with the British financial establishment in London, which the Labour Party had been courting since the early-1990s. Together with the Government's decision to remain within projected Conservative spending limits for its first two years in office, it helped to reassure sceptics of the Labour Party's fiscal "prudence". Associated changes moved regulation of banks away from the Bank of England to the Financial Services Authority- and these changes were unwound in 2013 following perceived failures by the FSA in the banking crisis.

=== Euro ===
The Blair ministry decided against joining the Eurozone, and adopting the euro as the currency to replace the pound sterling. This decision was generally supported by the British public, and by all political parties in the UK, as well as the media.

On 24 June 1998, The Sun had famously put the front-page headline "Is THIS the most dangerous man in Britain?" beside a photograph of Blair, when it was still uncertain whether he would lead Britain into the Euro, or keep the sterling currency.

=== Domestic politics ===
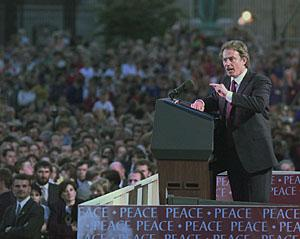
Blair in Armagh, Northern Ireland, September 1998

One of Blair's first acts as prime minister was to replace the then twice-weekly 15-minute sessions of Prime Minister's Questions held on Tuesdays and Thursdays with a single 30-minute session on Wednesdays. In addition to PMQs, Blair held monthly press conferences at which he fielded questions from journalists and – from 2002 – broke precedent by agreeing to give evidence twice yearly before the most senior Commons select committee, the Liaison Committee.

In the early years of his first term, Blair relied on political advice from a close circle of his staff, among whom was his press secretary and official spokesman Alastair Campbell. Campbell was permitted to give orders to civil servants, who had previously taken instructions only from ministers. Unlike some of his predecessors, Campbell was a political appointee and had not come up through the Civil Service. Despite his overtly political role, he was paid from public funds as a civil servant. Also in Blair's team were a number of strong female aides, who acted as gatekeepers and go-betweens, including Anji Hunter, Kate Garvey, Ruth Turner and Sally Morgan.

A significant achievement of Blair's first term was the signing, on 10 April 1998, of the Belfast Agreement, more commonly referred to as the "Good Friday Agreement". In the Good Friday Agreement, most Northern Irish political parties, together with the UK and Irish Governments, agreed upon an "exclusively peaceful and democratic" framework for the governance of Northern Ireland and a new set of political institutions for the province. In November 1998, Blair became the first UK prime minister to address Dáil Éireann.

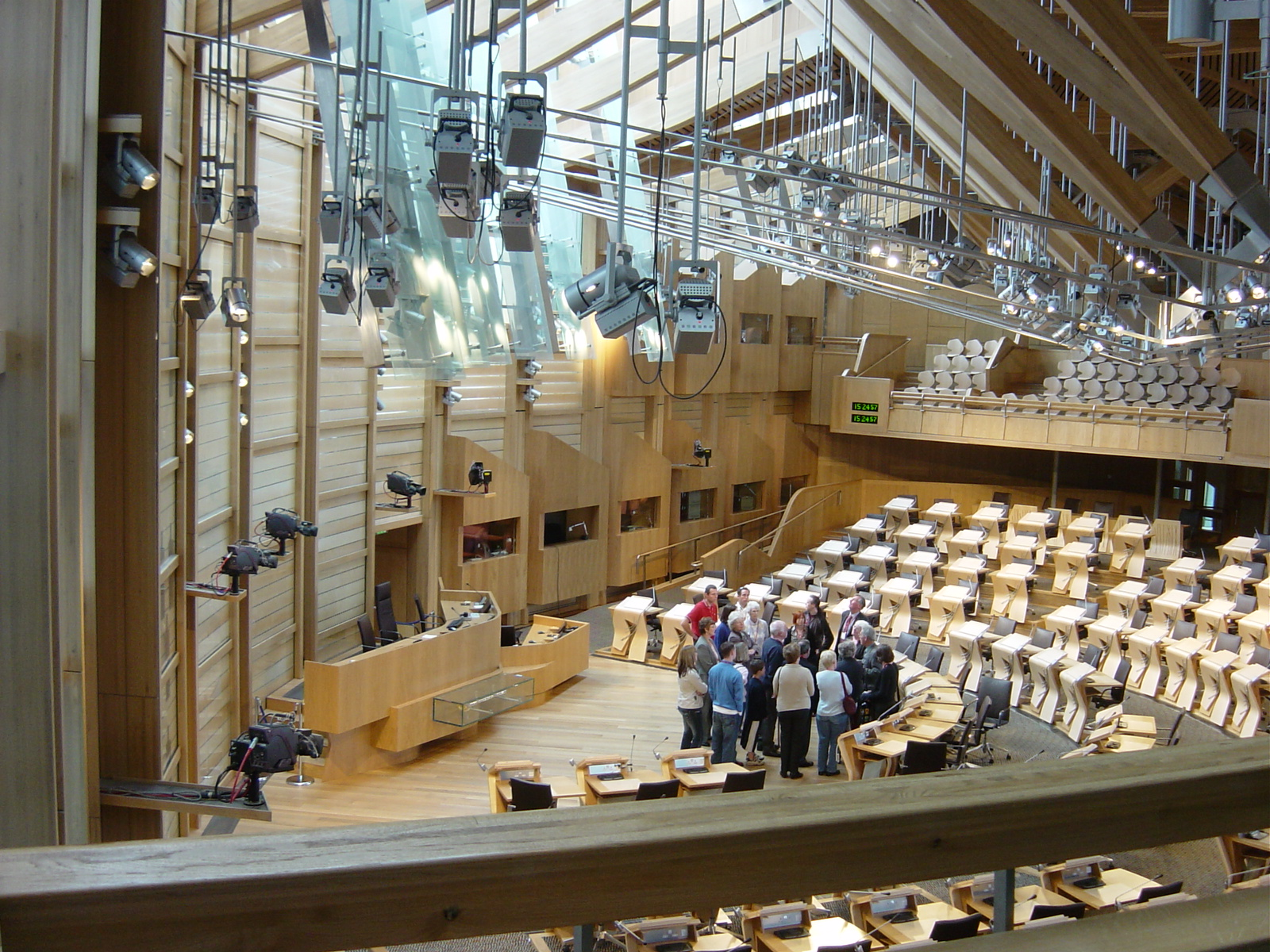
The Scottish Parliament Building in Holyrood

Blair's first term saw an extensive programme of changes to the constitution. The Human Rights Act was introduced in 1998; a Scottish Parliament and a Welsh Assembly were established following referendums held with a majority voting in favour; most hereditary peers were removed from the House of Lords in 1999; the Greater London Authority and the position of Mayor of London were established in 2000; and the Freedom of Information Act was passed later in the same year, with its provisions coming into effect over the following decade. This last Act disappointed campaigners, whose hopes had been raised by a 1997 White Paper which had promised more robust legislation. Blair later described the FoIA as one of his "biggest regrets", writing in his autobiography, "I quake at the imbecility of it." Whether the House of Lords should be fully appointed, fully elected, or be subject to a combination of the two remains a disputed question to the present day. 2003 saw a series of inconclusive votes on the subject in the House of Commons.

Significant change took place to legislation relating to rights of lesbian, gay, bisexual and transgender people during Blair's period in office. During his first term, the age of consent for homosexuals was equalised at sixteen years of age (see Sexual Offences (Amendment) Act 2000) and the ban on homosexuals in the armed forces was lifted. Subsequently, in 2005, a Civil Partnership Act came into effect, allowing gay couples to form legally recognised partnerships with the same rights as a traditional heterosexual marriage. At the end of September 2006, more than 30,000 Britons had entered into Civil Partnerships as a result of this law. Adoption by same-sex couples was legalised, and discrimination in the workplace (Employment Equality (Sexual Orientation) Regulations 2003), and in relation to the provision of goods and services (Equality Act (Sexual Orientation) Regulations) were both made illegal. Transgender people were given the right to change their birth certificate to reflect their new gender as a result of the Gender Recognition Act 2004.

Blair's touch was less sure with regard to the Millennium Dome project. The incoming government greatly expanded the size of the project and consequently increased expectations of what would be delivered. Just before its opening, Blair claimed the Dome would be "a triumph of confidence over cynicism, boldness over blandness, excellence over mediocrity". In the words of BBC correspondent Robert Orchard, "the Dome was to be highlighted as a glittering New Labour achievement in the next election manifesto".

In December 1998 Blair was alerted by special adviser Geoff Mulgan that the Horizon I.T. system, at that time in the process of being installed by the post office to replace the old Capture system, was "potentially unreliable" and "increasingly flawed". The Horizon system would later be at the centre of the British Post Office scandal, in which hundreds of postmasters were wrongly convicted of theft and fraud based on faulty accounting data from Horizon. Blair apparently raised concerns over Mulgan's claims, but was assured by his trade and industry secretary, Peter Mandelson, that the system was proven to be "viable [and] robust" and allowed the rollout of the system to go ahead.

=== Social policies ===
During his first term as prime minister, Blair raised taxes; introduced a National Minimum Wage and some new employment rights; introduced significant constitutional reforms; promoted new rights for gay people in the Civil Partnership Act 2004; and signed treaties integrating the UK more closely with the EU. He introduced substantial market-based reforms in the education and health sectors; introduced student tuition fees; sought to reduce certain categories of welfare payments, and introduced tough anti-terrorism and identity card legislation. Under Blair's government, the amount of new legislation increased which attracted criticism. Blair increased police powers by adding to the number of arrestable offences, compulsory DNA recording and the use of dispersal orders.

According to one study, in terms of promoting social equality, the first Blair Government "turned out to be the most redistributive in decades; it ran Harold Wilson's 1960s' government close." From 1997 to 2005, for instance, all the benefits targeted on children through Tax Credits, Child Benefit and Income Support had gone up by 72% in real terms. Improvements were also made in financial support to pensioners, and by 2004, the poorest third of pensioners were £1,750 a year better off than under the system as it used to be. As a means of reducing energy costs and therefore the incidence of fuel poverty, a new programme of grants for cavity wall and loft insulation and for draught proofing was launched, with some 670,000 homes taking up the scheme. Various adjustments were also made in social welfare benefits. Families were allowed to earn a little more before Housing Benefit was cut, and the benefit was raised for families where the main earner worked part-time, while 2,000,000 pensioners were offered automatic help with their council tax bills, worth £400 each, although many did not take advantage of this benefit. According to one study, the Blair ministry's record on benefits, taken in the round, was "unprecedented", with 3.7% real terms growth each year from 2002 to 2005.

Under the years of the Blair ministry, expenditure on social services was increased, while various anti-poverty measures were introduced. From 2001 to 2005, public spending increased by an average of 4.8% in real terms, while spending on transport went up by 8.5% per annum, health by 8.2% per annum, and education by 5.4% per annum. Between 1997 and 2005, child poverty was more than halved in absolute terms as a result of measures such as the extension of maternity pay, increases in child benefit, and by the growth in the numbers of people in employment. During that same period, the number of pensioners living in poverty fell by over 75% in absolute terms as a result of initiatives such as the introduction of Winter Fuel Payments, the reduction of VAT on fuel, and the introduction of a Minimum Income Guarantee. To reduce poverty traps for those making the transition from welfare to work, a minimum wage was established, together with a Working Tax Credit and a Child Tax Credit. Together with various tax credit schemes to supplement low earnings, the Blair Government's policies significantly increased the earnings of the lowest income decile. In addition, under the Working Time Regulations of 1998, British workers gained a statutory entitlement to paid holidays.

Between 1997 and 2003, spending on early years education and childcare rose in real terms from £2.0 billion to £3.6 billion. During Blair's first term in office, 100 "Early Excellence" centres opened, together with new nurseries, while 500 Sure Start projects began. Although the number of children fell, the amount of state support to families with children increased, with money paid only to them (child contingent support) going up by 52% in real terms from 1999 to 2005. The Blair ministry also extended to three-year-olds the right to a free nursery place for half a day Monday to Friday. Tax credits assisted some 300,000 families (at January 2004) with childcare costs, while the 2004 budget exempted the first £50 of weekly payments to nannies and childminders from tax and National Insurance, restricted to couples earning not more than £43,000 per annum. The Countryside and Rights of Way Act 2000 extended a legal right to walk to about 3,200 square miles of open countryside, mainly in the North of England.

During its first year in office, the Blair Government made the controversial decision of cutting Lone Parent Benefit, which led to abstentions amongst many Labour MPs. In March 1998, however, Brown responded in his Budget statement by increasing child benefit by £2.50 a week above the rate of inflation, the largest ever increase in the benefit. Public expenditure on education, health, and social security rose more rapidly under the Blair government than it did under previous Labour governments, the latter due to initiatives such as the introduction of the Working Families Tax Credit and increases in pensions and child benefits. During the Blair Government's time in office, incomes for the bottom 10% of earners increased as a result of transfers through the social security system.

New rights for workers were introduced such as extended parental rights, a significant raising of the maximum compensation figure for unfair dismissal, a restoration of the qualifying period for protection against unfair dismissal to twelve months, and the right to be accompanied by a trade union official during a disciplinary or grievance hearing, whether or not a trade union is recognised. In addition, an Employee Relation Act was passed which introduced for the first time ever, the legal right of employees to trade union representation. In 2003, the Working Families Tax Credit was split into two benefits: a Working Tax Credit which was payable to all those in work, and a Child Tax Credit which was payable to all families with children, whether in work or not. During Blair's time in office, over 2,000,000 people had been lifted out of poverty.

A proportional voting system was introduced for the election of Britain's MEPs, while legislation changing executive structures in local government was passed. Regional Development Agencies were set up in the 8 English regions outside London, and changes were made to the regulation of political parties and referendums, with the introduction of a new Electoral Commission and stricter spending rules. In addition, voting experiments resulted in an opening up of postal voting and reform of electoral registration, while the right of hereditary peers to sit in the House of Lords was largely abolished after 700 years. In addition, the Water Industries Act 1999 ended the right of water companies to disconnect supplies "as a sanction against non-payment."

The Employment Act 2002 extended rights to paternity, maternity, and adoption leave and pay, while the Police Reform Act 2002 established community support officers and reorganised national intelligence gathering. The Adoption and Children Act 2002 enabled unmarried couples to apply to adopt while speeding up adoption procedures, while the Private Hire Vehicles (Carriage of Guide Dogs) Act 2002 banned charges for guide dogs in minicabs. The International Development Act 2002 required spending to be used to reduce poverty and improve the welfare of the poor. The Travel Concessions (Eligibility) Act 2002 equalised the age at which men and women become entitled to travel concessions. Under the Homelessness Act 2002, councils had to adopt homelessness strategies and do more for those homeless through no fault of their own, and the Commonhold and Leasehold Reform Act 2002 made it easier to convert long-term residential leasehold into freehold through "commonhold" tenures. The British Overseas Territories Act 2002 extended full British citizenship to 200,000 inhabitants of 14 British Overseas Territories, while the Office of Communications Act 2002 set up a new regulatory body known as the Office of Communications (Ofcom). The Enterprise Act 2002 included measures to safeguard consumers, while also reforming bankruptcy and establishing a stronger Office of Fair Trading.

=== Immigration ===
Non-European immigration rose significantly during the period from 1997, not least because of the government's abolition of the primary purpose rule in June 1997. This change made it easier for UK residents to bring foreign spouses into the country. A former government advisor, Andrew Neather, stated in the Evening Standard that the deliberate policy of ministers from late-2000 until early-2008 was to open up the UK to mass migration.

=== Foreign policy ===
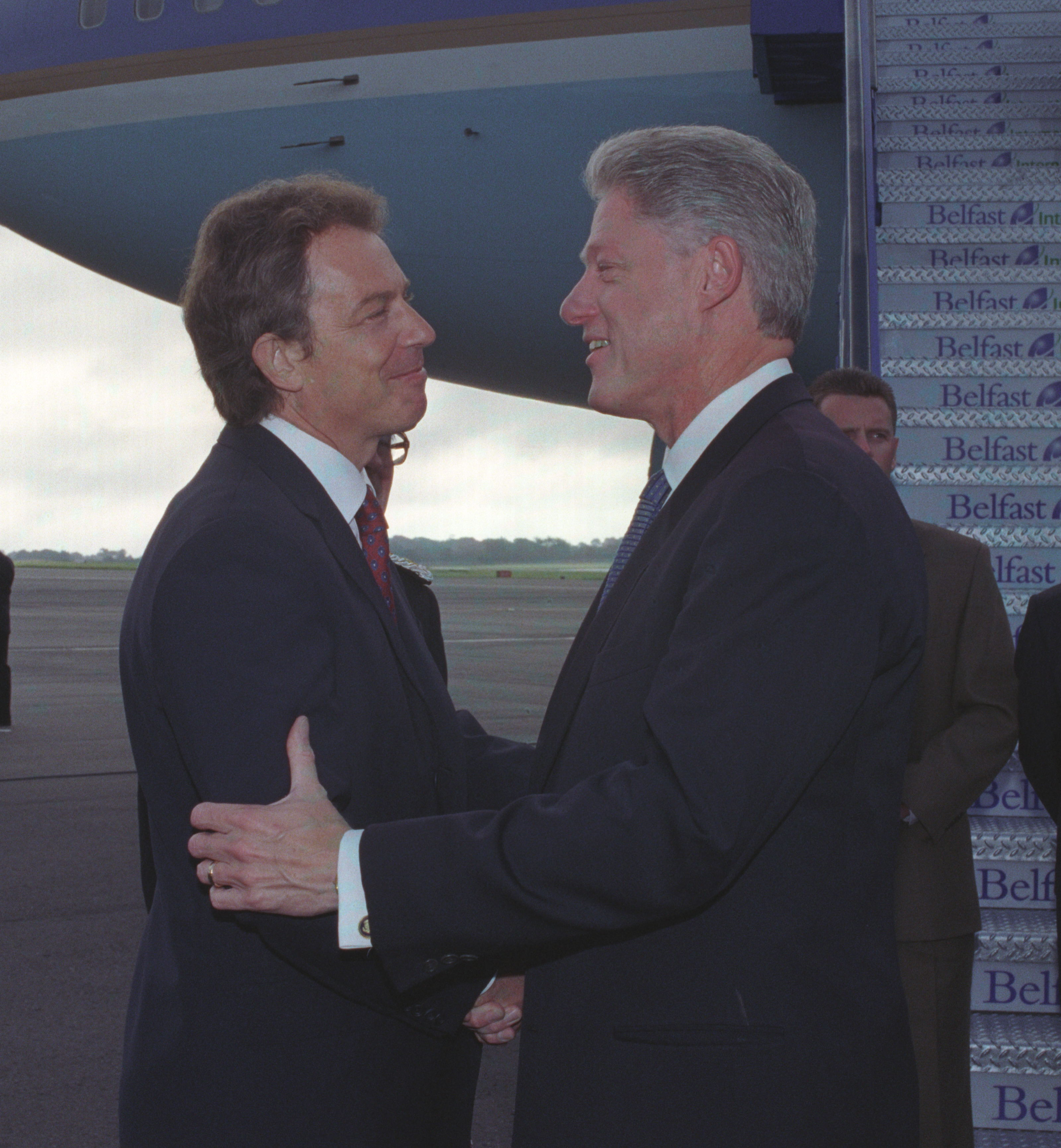
Blair with President Bill Clinton in Belfast in 1998

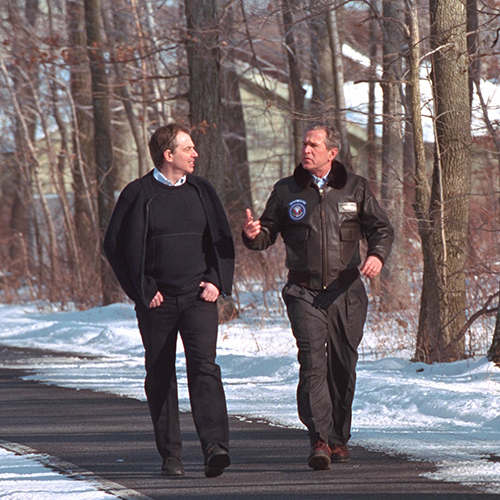
Blair with President George W. Bush at Camp David in 2001

In 1999, Blair planned and presided over the declaration of the Kosovo War. While in opposition, the Labour Party had criticised the Conservatives for their perceived weakness during the Bosnian war, and Blair was among those urging a strong line by NATO against Slobodan Milošević. Blair was criticised both by those on the left who opposed the war in principle and by some others who believed that the Serbs were fighting a legitimate war of self-defence. One month into the war, on 22 April 1999, Blair made a speech in Chicago setting out his "Doctrine of the International Community". This later became known by the media as the "Blair doctrine", and played a part in Blair's decision to order the British military intervention in the Sierra Leone Civil War in May 2000.

Another significant change in 1997 was the creation of the Department for International Development, shifting global development policy away from the Foreign and Commonwealth Office to an independent ministry with a Cabinet-level minister.

Also in 1999, Blair was awarded the Charlemagne Prize by the German city of Aachen for his contributions to the European ideal and to peace in Europe.

== Second term (June 2001 – May 2005) ==
=== 2001 general election landslide victory ===
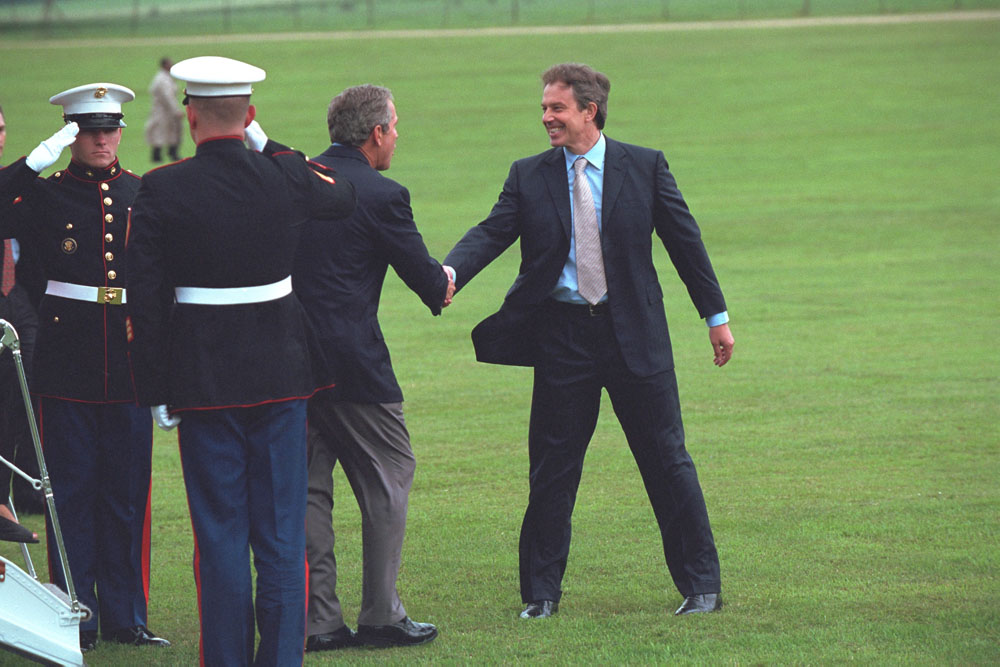
Blair welcoming President Bush to Chequers on 19 July 2001

In the 2001 general election campaign, Blair emphasised the theme of improving public services, notably the National Health Service and the education system. The Conservatives concentrated on opposing British membership of the Euro. The Labour Party retained its large parliamentary majority, and Blair became the first Labour prime minister to win a full second term. However, the election was notable for a large fall in voter turnout.

=== War in Afghanistan ===
Following the 11 September terrorist attacks on the United States in 2001, Blair was very quick to align the UK with the United States, engaging in a round of shuttle diplomacy to help form and maintain an international coalition prior to the 2001 war against Afghanistan. He maintains his diplomatic activity to this day, showing a willingness to visit countries that other world leaders might consider too dangerous to visit. In 2003, he became the first Briton since Winston Churchill to be awarded a Congressional Gold Medal by the United States Congress for being "a staunch and steadfast ally of the United States of America", although media attention was drawn to the fact that Blair did not attend the ceremony to receive his medal. In 2003, Blair was also awarded an Ellis Island Medal of Honor for his support of the United States after 9/11—the first non-American to receive the honour.

=== War in Iraq ===
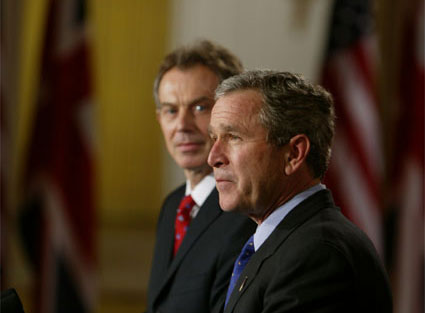
Blair and Bush addressing the media after privately discussing the Iraq War

Blair gave strong support to US president George W. Bush's policy of invading Iraq in 2003. He soon became the face of international support for the war, often clashing with French president Jacques Chirac, who became the face of international opposition. Widely regarded as a more persuasive speaker than Bush, Blair gave many speeches arguing for the overthrow of Saddam Hussein in the days leading up to the invasion.

Blair's case for war was based on Iraq's alleged possession of weapons of mass destruction and consequent violation of UN resolutions. He was wary of making direct appeals for regime change, since international law does not recognise this as a ground for war. A memorandum from a July 2002 meeting that was leaked in April 2005 showed that Blair believed that the British public would support regime change in the right political context; the document, however, stated that legal grounds for such action were weak. On 24 September 2002, the UK Government published a dossier based on the intelligence agencies' assessments of Iraq's weapons of mass destruction. Among the items in the dossier was a recently received intelligence report that "the Iraqi military are able to deploy chemical or biological weapons within 45 minutes of an order to do so". A further briefing paper on Iraq's alleged WMDs was issued to journalists in February 2003. This document was discovered to have taken a large part of its text without attribution from a PhD thesis available on the internet. Where the thesis hypothesised about possible WMDs, the Downing Street version presented the ideas as fact. The document subsequently became known as the "Dodgy Dossier".

46,000 British troops, one-third of the total strength of the British Army (land forces), were deployed to assist with the invasion of Iraq. When after the war, no weapons of mass destruction were found in Iraq, the two dossiers, together with Blair's other pre-war statements, became an issue of considerable controversy. Many Labour Party members, including a number who had supported the war, were among the critics. Successive independent inquiries (including those by the Foreign Affairs Select Committee of the House of Commons, the senior judge Lord Hutton, and the former senior civil servant Lord Butler of Brockwell) have found that Blair honestly stated what he believed to be true at the time, though Lord Butler's report did impl that the Government's presentation of the intelligence evidence had been subject to some degree of exaggeration. These findings have not prevented frequent accusations that Blair was deliberately deceitful, and, during the 2005 election campaign, Conservative leader Michael Howard made political capital out of the issue.

Then Secretary General of the United Nations, Kofi Annan, stated in September 2004 that the invasion was "illegal", but did not state the legal basis for this assertion. Prior to the war, the UK attorney general Lord Goldsmith, who acts as the Government's legal advisor, had advised Blair that the war was legal.

British Armed Forces were active in southern Iraq to stabilise the country in the run-up to the Iraqi elections of January 2005. In October 2004, the UK government agreed to a request from US forces to send a battalion of the Black Watch regiment to the American sector to free up US troops for an assault on Fallujah. The subsequent deployment of the Black Watch was criticised by some in Britain on the grounds that its alleged ultimate purpose was to assist George Bush's re-election in the 2004 US presidential election. As of September 2006, 7,500 British forces remained in Southern Iraq, around the city of Basra. After the presidential election, Blair tried to use his relationship with President Bush to persuade the US to devote efforts to resolving the Israeli–Palestinian conflict.

In an interview with David Frost on Al Jazeera in November 2006, Blair appeared to agree with Frost's assessment that the war had been "pretty much of a disaster", although a Downing Street spokesperson denied that this was an accurate reflection of Blair's view.

=== Domestic politics ===
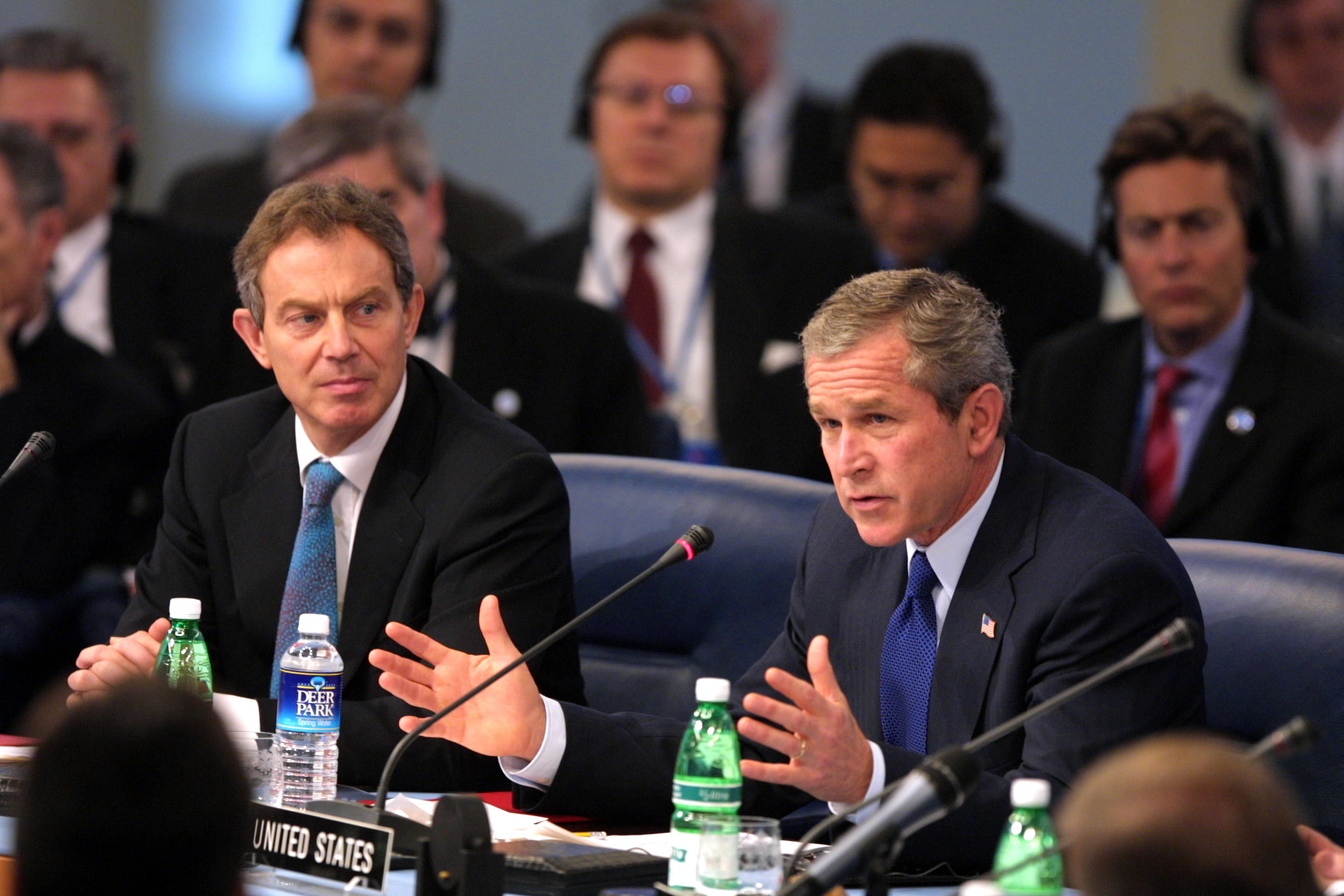
Blair and Bush addressing world leaders during the meeting of the NATO-Russia Council at Pratica di Mare Air Force base near Rome, Italy.

After fighting the 2001 general election on the theme of improving public services, Blair's government raised taxes in 2002 (described by the Conservatives as "stealth taxes") to increase spending on education and health. Blair insisted the increased funding would have to be matched by internal reforms. The government introduced the Foundation Hospitals scheme to allow NHS hospitals financial autonomy, although the eventual shape of the proposals, after an internal Labour Party struggle with Gordon Brown, allowed for less freedom than Blair had wished. By increasing funding, capacity and redesigning incentives, maximum waits for NHS planned operations fell from 18 months to 18 weeks, and public satisfaction with the NHS almost doubled.

The peace process in Northern Ireland hit a series of problems. In October 2002, the Northern Ireland Assembly established under the Good Friday Agreement was suspended. Attempts to persuade the IRA to decommission its weapons were unsuccessful, and, in the second set of elections to the Assembly in November 2003, the staunchly unionist Democratic Unionist Party replaced the more moderate Ulster Unionist Party as Northern Ireland's largest unionist party, making a return to devolved government more difficult. At the same time, Sinn Féin replaced the more moderate SDLP as the province's largest nationalist party.

On 3 August 2003, Blair became the longest continuously-serving Labour prime minister of the United Kingdom, surpassing Clement Attlee's six-year term from 1945 to 1951. On 5 February 2005, Blair became the longest-serving Labour prime minister in British history, surpassing the near eight-year total Harold Wilson served over his two terms in office.

The Hutton Inquiry into the death of Dr. David Kelly reported on 2 August, ruled that he had committed suicide, and despite widespread expectations that the report would criticise Blair and his government, Hutton cleared the Government of deliberately inserting false intelligence into the September Dossier, while criticising the BBC editorial process which had allowed unfounded allegations to be broadcast. Evidence to the inquiry raised further questions over the use of intelligence in the run-up to the war, and the report did not satisfy opponents of Blair and of the war. After a similar decision by President Bush, Blair set up another inquiry—the Butler Review—into the accuracy and presentation of the intelligence relating to Iraq's alleged weapons of mass destruction. Opponents of the war, especially the Liberal Democrats, refused to participate in this inquiry, since it did not meet their demands for a full public inquiry into whether the war was justified.

The political fallout from the Iraq War continued to dog Blair's premiership after the Butler Review. On 25 August 2004, Plaid Cymru MP Adam Price announced he would attempt to impeach Blair, hoping to invoke a Parliamentary procedure that has lain dormant for 150 years but has never been abolished. However, of 640 MPs in the House of Commons only 23 backed the Commons motion—officially known as an Early day motion—in support of considering "whether there exist sufficient grounds to impeach" Blair (a 24th MP signed the motion but later withdrew his name). The Early Day Motion has now expired.

In April 2004, Blair announced that a referendum would be held on the ratification of the EU Constitution. This represented a significant development in British politics: only one nationwide referendum had previously been held (in 1975, on whether the UK should remain in the EEC), though a referendum had been promised if the Government decided to join the Euro, and referendums had been held on devolved structures of government in Scotland, Wales and Northern Ireland. It was a dramatic change of policy for Blair, who had previously dismissed calls for a referendum unless the constitution fundamentally altered the UK's relationship with the EU. Michael Howard seized upon this "EU-turn", reminding Blair of his declaration to the 2003 Labour Party conference that "I can only go one way. I haven't got a reverse gear". The referendum was expected to be held in early 2006; however, after the French and Dutch rejections of the constitution, the Blair government announced it was suspending plans for a referendum for the foreseeable future.

During his second term, Blair was increasingly the target for protests. His speech to the 2004 Labour Party conference, for example, was interrupted both by a protester against the Iraq War and by a group that opposed the government's decision to allow the House of Commons to ban fox hunting.

On 15 September 2004, Blair delivered a speech on the environment and the 'urgent issue' of climate change. In unusually direct language he concluded that "If what the science tells us about climate change is correct, then unabated it will result in catastrophic consequences for our world ... The science, almost certainly, is correct." The action he proposed to take appeared to be based on business and investment rather than legislative or tax-based attempts to reduce carbon dioxide emissions: "it is possible to combine reducing emissions with economic growth ... investment in science and technology and in the businesses associated with it".

=== Immigration ===
Archive papers released by the National Archives in December 2023 show that Blair considered more "radical" ideas such as legislating "incompatibility" with the European Convention on Human Rights (ECHR) and starting a "safe haven" scheme in third countries.

=== Health problems ===
On 19 October 2003, it emerged Blair had received treatment for an irregular heartbeat. Having felt ill the previous day, he went to hospital and was diagnosed with supraventricular tachycardia. This was treated by cardioversion and he returned home that night. He was reported to have taken the following day (20 October) more gently than usual and returned to a full schedule on 21 October. Downing Street aides later suggested the palpitations had been brought on by drinking lots of strong coffee at an EU summit and then working-out vigorously in the gym. However, former minister Lewis Moonie, a doctor, said the treatment was more serious than Number 10 had admitted: "Anaesthetising somebody and giving their heart electric shocks is not something you just do in the routine run of medical practice."

In September 2004, in off-the-cuff remarks during an interview with ITV News, Lord Bragg said Blair was "under colossal strain" over "considerations of his family" and that Blair had thought "things over very carefully." This led to speculation Blair would resign. Although details of a family problem were known by the press, no paper reported them because according to one journalist, to have done so would have breached "the bounds of privacy and media responsibility."

Blair underwent a catheter ablation to correct his irregular heartbeat on 1 October 2004, after announcing the procedure on the previous day, in a series of interviews in which he also declared he would seek a third term as prime minister, but not a fourth. The planned procedure was carried out at London's Hammersmith Hospital.

== Third term (May 2005 – June 2007) ==
=== 2005 general election victory ===
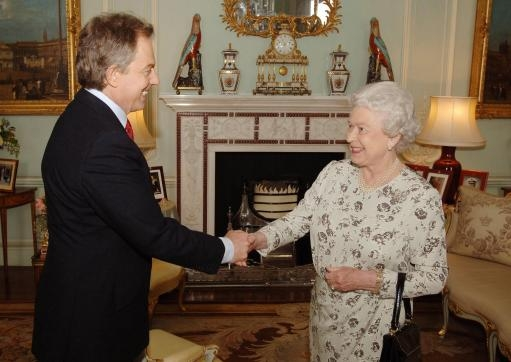
The Queen receiving Blair at Buckingham Palace after his party won a third term in office, 2005

The Labour Party won the 2005 general election held on Thursday 5 May and a third consecutive term in office, for the first time ever. However, Labour won fewer votes in England than the Conservatives. The next day, Blair was invited to form a government by Queen Elizabeth II. The reduction in the Labour Party's majority (from 167 to 66 seats) and the low share of the popular vote (35%) led to some Labour MPs calling for Blair to leave office sooner rather than later; among them was Frank Dobson, who had served in Blair's cabinet during his first term. However, dissenting voices quickly vanished as Blair took on European leaders over the future direction of the European Union in June 2005. This election also marked the last victory by the Labour Party until the 2024 general election.

=== G8 and EU presidencies ===
The rejection by France and the Netherlands of the treaty to establish a constitution for the European Union presented Blair with an opportunity to postpone a UK referendum and Foreign Secretary Jack Straw announced that the Parliamentary Bill to enact a referendum was suspended indefinitely. It had previously been agreed that ratification would continue unless the treaty had been rejected by at least five of the 25 European Union member states who must all ratify it. In an address to the European Parliament, Blair stated: "I believe in Europe as a political project. I believe in Europe with a strong and caring social dimension."

Jacques Chirac held several meetings with Schröder and the pair pressed for the UK to give up the rebate won by Margaret Thatcher in 1984. After verbal conflict over several weeks, Blair, along with the leaders of all 25 EU member states, descended on Brussels for the EU Summit of 18 June 2005 to attempt to finalise the EU budget for 2007–13. Blair refused to renegotiate the rebate unless the proposals included a compensating overhaul of EU spending, particularly on the Common Agricultural Policy which composes 44% of the EU budget. The CAP stayed as it was agreed upon in 2002 and no decision about the budget was reached under the Luxembourg presidency.

=== London to host the 2012 Summer Olympics ===
On 6 July 2005, during the 117th International Olympic Committee (IOC) session in Singapore, the IOC announced that the 2012 Summer Olympics, the Games of the XXX Olympiad, were awarded to London over Paris by only four votes. The competition between Paris and London to host the Games had become increasingly heated particularly after French president Jacques Chirac commented three days before the vote that "one cannot trust people [ie: the British] whose cuisine are so bad." The surprise win by London over the perceived frontrunner Paris was said to have been decided by the presence of Blair at the IOC session. Irish IOC member Patrick Hickey said, "This is down to Tony Blair. If he hadn't come here I'd say that six to eight votes would have been lost and London would not be sitting here today winners".

=== 2005 London bombings ===
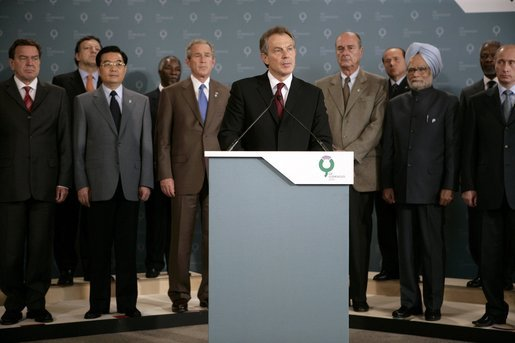
Blair, flanked by G8 leaders, reads a statement on their behalf condemning the attacks in London.

On Thursday 7 July 2005, a series of four bomb explosions struck London's public transport system during the morning rush-hour. All four incidents were suicide bombings. Fifty-six people were killed and 700 people were injured. The incident was the deadliest single act of terrorism in the United Kingdom since the 1988 bombing of Pan Am Flight 103 over Lockerbie, Scotland which killed 270 people and replaced the 1998 Omagh bombing (29 dead) as the second-most deadly terrorist attack on British soil. It was also the deadliest bombing in London since World War II.

Blair made a statement about the day's bombings, saying that he believed it was "reasonably clear" that it was an act of terror, and that he hoped the people of Britain could demonstrate that their will to overcome the events is greater than the terrorists' wish to cause destruction. He also said that his determination to "defend" the British way of life outweighed "extremist determination" to destroy it. On 13 July 2005, he told that international co-operation would be needed to "pull up this evil ideology by its roots".

On 21 July 2005, a second series of explosions were reported in London, two weeks and some hours after the 7 July 2005 London bombings. Four controlled explosions, of devices considerably less advanced than those of the previous attacks, were carried out at Shepherd's Bush, Warren Street and Oval underground stations, and on a bus in Shoreditch. Even though the attacks on 21 July were less severe than those two weeks earlier, Blair was reported to have said that the bombings in London were intended "to scare people and to frighten them, to make them anxious and worried". He went on to say how the "police have done their very best, and the security services too, in the situation, and I think we have just got to react calmly and continue with our business as much as possible normal".

Concerns about terror attacks led to 10 Downing Street requesting media organisations not to identify the location of Blair's 2005 summer holiday. After Blair attended a public function it was acknowledged that the holiday was in Barbados, as a guest of the singer Cliff Richard with whom Blair had stayed with before. During a renewed stay there in August 2006, Blair refused to endorse calls for a ceasefire in Lebanon.

A Guardian/ICM poll conducted after the first wave of attacks found that 64% of the British population believed that Blair's decision to wage war in Iraq had led indirectly to the terrorist attacks on London. The public did however indicate approval of Blair's handling of the attacks, with his approval rating moving into positive territory for the first time in five years. In December 2005, Blair was presented with the "Statesman of the Decade" award by the EastWest Institute, a trans-Atlantic think tank that organises an annual Security Conference in Brussels.

Proposed laws to cope with the threat of terrorism proved extremely controversial; an amendment to require that glorifying terrorism be deliberate to be an offence was rejected in the House of Commons by just three votes (a result initially announced as a one-vote margin, due to a miscount). The proposal to allow terrorist suspects to be held for questioning for up to 90 days was defeated on 9 November by a margin of 31 with 49 Labour MPs voting against the government. Instead, MPs supported an amendment to allow questioning for 28 days proposed by veteran backbencher David Winnick. This was Blair's first defeat on the floor of the House of Commons since he became prime minister in 1997, and most commentators saw this as seriously undermining his authority.

=== Education reforms, 2006 ===
The introduction of further reforms to the education system, which restricted the involvement of local education authorities in opening new schools, proved controversial. Labour backbenchers opposed to the proposals produced a rival manifesto, and the Bill to introduce the changes was delayed while the government negotiated with them. The Conservative Party declared its support for the reforms, making passage certain but increasing the likelihood that Labour MPs would vote against them. On 15 March 2006, the Education and Inspections Bill passed its second reading, with 52 Labour MPs voting against; had the Conservative Party also voted against it would have been defeated.

=== Local elections on 4 May 2006 and cabinet reshuffle ===
The local elections in England on 4 May 2006 dealt a blow to Blair, with the loss of 317 seats and 18 councils. This result was thought to be partly continued fallout from public dissatisfaction over the decision to invade Iraq, and partly due to a scandal concerning the Home Office's mishandling of the deportation of foreign criminals. At the same time, an affair of Deputy Prime Minister John Prescott with his diary secretary had been made public. Further, some Primary care and Hospital Trust sustained significant deficits and had to release staff, which called into question the position of Health Secretary Patricia Hewitt. On 5 May, Blair reshuffled his Cabinet. Most significantly, Home Secretary Charles Clarke and Foreign Secretary Jack Straw were relieved of their duties and many other positions were reassigned.

=== Darfur ===
Blair urged EU member states on 20 October 2006 to send a strong message to the Sudanese government that it must allow a UN force into Darfur, arguing that it is a critical time for Darfur and therefore a chance for the EU to strengthen the pressure on the Sudanese government.

=== Debate over Muslim women wearing veils ===
A debate over Muslim women wearing veils developed after Leader of the House of Commons Jack Straw said he asked women in his constituency to remove them when they visited him. Blair believed that this was a "mark of separation" and made some "outside the community feel uncomfortable". He also backed Kirklees Council, which suspended a classroom assistant Aishah Azmi for refusing to remove her full-face veil at school.

=== Cash-for-Honours scandal ===
Blair was interviewed in connection with the "Cash-for-Honours" investigation by the police in December 2006, the first time that a serving prime minister has been questioned by police regarding a criminal investigation. He was interviewed for a second time on 26 January 2007 after the arrest of Downing Street official Ruth Turner. An embargo was placed on this news at the request of the Metropolitan Police until 1 February.

=== Resignation as Labour Party leader and Prime Minister ===
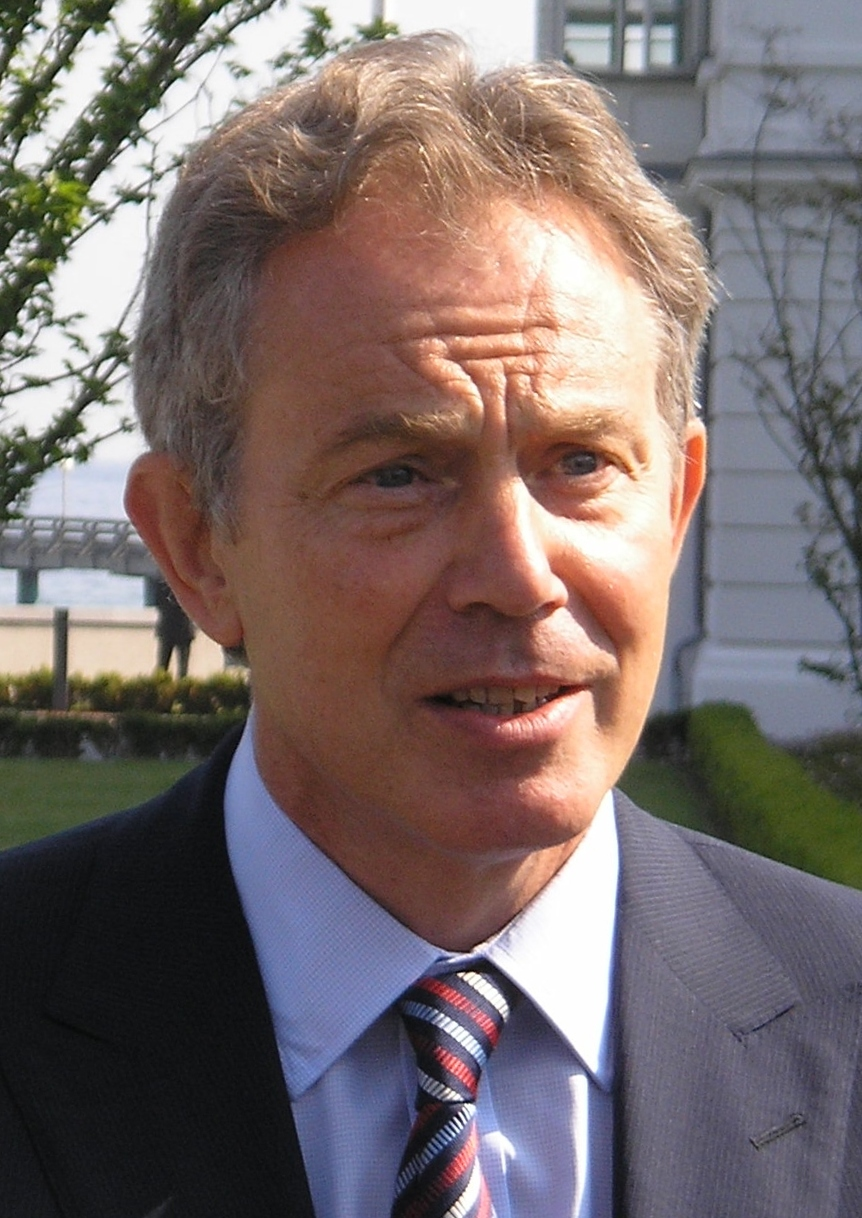
Blair at a news-conference in Heiligendamm, during the G8 summit

After the 2004 Labour Party conference, on 30 September 2004, Blair announced in a BBC interview that he would serve a "full third term" but would not contest a fourth general election. No term limits exist in British politics, and such an announcement was historically unprecedented. Blair said he would give "ample time" for his successor to establish himself before the next general election, likely to be held in 2009 or 2010.

Following the 2005 general election, in which Labour was re-elected but with a significantly reduced majority, there was constant speculation over the date of Blair's departure from office. At Westminster, he was expected to retire after the proposed UK referendum on a European Union Constitution, but the constitution being thwarted at referendums in other countries negated any need for one in the UK (such a major issue as a union-wide constitution would require unanimity amongst the EU's member states). The 7/7 terror attacks also reduced the likelihood of an early departure. Speculation as to the likely timing of Blair's departure increased in May 2006, following Labour's poor results at the English local elections.

It was reported on 30 July 2006 that Blair had agreed to a £4,000,000 deal, in exchange for his personal diaries, with a publishing firm owned by Rupert Murdoch.

On 5 September 2006, a letter signed by 17 Labour MPs called for Blair to resign. On the same day, 49 other Labour MPs signed a statement supporting Blair's departure timetable. The next day The Sun reported that Blair would step down as Leader of the Labour Party on 31 May 2007, and as prime minister when a new leader is elected. That same day, seven of the MPs who signed the letter resigned as Parliamentary Private Secretaries (unpaid and unofficial posts assisting Government ministers).

On 7 September 2006, Blair announced that the 2006 Labour Party conference would be his last as leader (in other words, he planned to resign by September 2007). He did not announce a specific timetable for either his departure or the election of a new leader, but he did state that he would "set a precise date" at some point in the future. On 26 September 2006, he restated this at Labour's annual conference "this is my last conference as leader".

On 24 November 2006, Tony Blair addressed the Scottish Labour Party conference as Labour Party leader and prime minister for the last time.

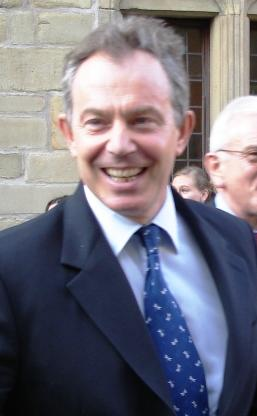
Blair in Osnabrück, Germany, 25 March 2007

His successor was widely expected to be Gordon Brown, the then Chancellor of the Exchequer, who launched his leadership bid on 11 May 2007. The only other politician to formally declare himself a contender for the Labour leadership following Blair's departure was the left-wing Labour MP John McDonnell, who launched his campaign on 14 July 2006. To stand in the leadership contest, candidates required the nominations of 12.5% of sitting Labour MPs—then 44 MPs.

On 2 May 2007, on the tenth anniversary of the 1997 general election, Tony Blair announced that he would be stepping down as prime minister in a matter of weeks. He further encouraged Gordon Brown as his successor as Leader of the Labour Party. On 3 May, it was further clarified by Downing Street that the exact date of resignation would be announced on 10 May. The following election of a new leader of the Labour Party was expected to take 48 days.

On 10 May 2007, Blair held a Cabinet meeting where he told his ministers about his resignation plans and later making a speech at the Trimdon Labour Club in his Sedgefield constituency before announcing at a press conference that he would step down as Prime Minister on 27 June 2007 and that he would be asking the NEC to begin seeking a successor as Labour leader immediately. His deputy, John Prescott, announced that he was also stepping down as deputy prime minister later in the day at his local meeting in Hull. Blair began a world tour with a visit to Paris on 11 May 2007 to visit newly elected French president Nicolas Sarkozy. His last two major events were the 33rd G8 summit in Heiligendamm and the European Council summit from 21 to 22 June 2007.

Gordon Brown was duly elected Labour leader as the only successfully nominated candidate with 313 nominations compared to John McDonnell's 29 at close of nominations on 17 May 2007, the result being declared formally and coming into effect on 24 June 2007 with Tony Blair resigning as Prime Minister on 27 June 2007 and Gordon Brown being asked to form a government by The Queen later that day. Blair stepped down as an MP immediately triggering a by-election in Sedgefield. He declined the traditional seat in the House of Lords offered to former prime ministers, commenting that it was "not my scene".

== Reception ==
=== Presidential style ===
Blair's style of leadership was seen as 'presidential' by various political commentators and authors. In 1997, Dan Balz of Washington Post examined Blair's leadership style:

Tony Blair has adopted many personas as Britain's leader: political reformer, griever in chief, general host of Friday night town meetings, relentless enforcer of a disciplined message. Both as a candidate and as Prime Minister, Blair has embraced a presidential style of leadership geared for the age of television and the era of declining faith of political parties.

Tony Blair's presidential style of leadership was the subject of study of Michael Foley's book The British Presidency: Tony Blair and the Politics of Public Leadership. Foley uses Blair's premiership as a case study to further the 'presidentialisation thesis', which is a model used to study the growing power of the British Prime Minister at the behest of the Cabinet, and the Parliament. According to Foley, centralisation of power under Blair, and his broader conduct in office points to the cementing of presidential tendencies in British politics. He writes:

The British Prime Minister has evolved, and is evolving away from what a Prime Minister used to do and used to be....Blair's premiership represents another part of the clinching proof that British politics has accommodated and adjusted to a distinctive presidential dimension.

Thomas Poguntke and Paul Webb also studied the presidentialisation of the British government, and have mentioned the various aspects of Blair's premiership, that as whole, point to his presidential nature. These included:

- Blair's heavy reliance on the Prime Minister's Office for decision making rather than the Cabinet.
- His step of strengthening the executive office at Whitehall.
- Extensive changes were made to the Prime Minister's Office, which also included the appointment of a chief of staff.
- The staff of the Prime Minister Office grew from 110 to 150 by the end of Blair's first term as premier. Special advisors assisting Blair increased from 8 (during John Major's term) to 25.

Collectively, Blair's premiership has been informally referred to by many academics and political opponents as a "sofa government", as Blair was reliant on his advisors and close colleagues for decision making, rather than the Cabinet. This depiction of Blair has been endorsed by various of Blair's own party member and ministers, including, Graham Allen, Mo Mowlam and Clare Short. The Butler Review of 2004 also criticised Blair's style of sofa government.

The nature of cabinet meetings reflects this movement to "sofa government" as well with cabinet meetings tending to last no longer than 30 to 45 minutes changing the role of cabinet to discuss new policy to introduce to simply approving what Blair had discussed previously with his advisors.

=== Blair defended ===
Various authors and writers have criticised the application of the presidentialisation thesis on the premiership of Tony Blair and have instead defended Blair. They have termed the use of presidential analogies for Blair as an unfair comparison between two systems that are fundamentally different. According to Richard Heffernan, for example, British prime ministers, including Blair, have dispensed their duties in a parliamentary model of governance, which is essentially very different from presidential models, which are largely based on the principle of separation of powers. In this context, Blair had four defeats in the Parliament, including an amendment that would have allowed the conditional detention of terrorism suspects.

Political commentators have also pointed to the constant tussle between the chancellor, Gordon Brown, and Tony Blair as evidence that the prime minister was not all too powerful. This, according to them, demonstrates that the Cabinet was still an effective arena for political dialogue.

== See also ==
- Blairism
- Premiership of Gordon Brown
- Presidency of Bill Clinton
- Presidency of George W. Bush
- Taking Liberties (film)

British premierships
Preceded by Major	Blair premiership 1997–2007	Succeeded by Brown
