= Scottish Global Forum =

Scottish think tank

- The SGF logo
- Abbreviation: SGF
- Formation: 2013; 13 years ago
- Location: Glasgow, Scotland
- Director: John MacDonald

The Scottish Global Forum is a Scottish think tank which aims to analyse global issues affecting Scotland and its role in the world. The focus is on areas relevant to Scottish public policy and legislation - "Scotland’s domestic politics, economics and security, and also its relations with other states, sub-state actors and international institutions" - but also to inform the general public.

== Notable Fellows and advisory board members ==
- Alyson Bailes - Adjunct Professor, University of Iceland; former UK ambassador to Finland
- Colin Fleming - Research Fellow, University of Edinburgh
- David Hayman - Actor, director, social campaigner
- Christian Kaunert - Director of European Institute for Security and Justice, University of Dundee
- Sarah Léonard - Senior Lecturer in Politics, University of Dundee
- Norrie MacQueen - Honorary Research Fellow, University of St Andrews
- Andrew Parrott - Lt Col (retd), British Army
- David Pratt - Foreign Editor, Sunday Herald
- Brandon Valeriano - Senior Lecturer in Global Security, University of Glasgow
- William Walker - Professor Emeritus of International Relations, University of St Andrews
