= Susan Watts =

British journalist (born 1962)

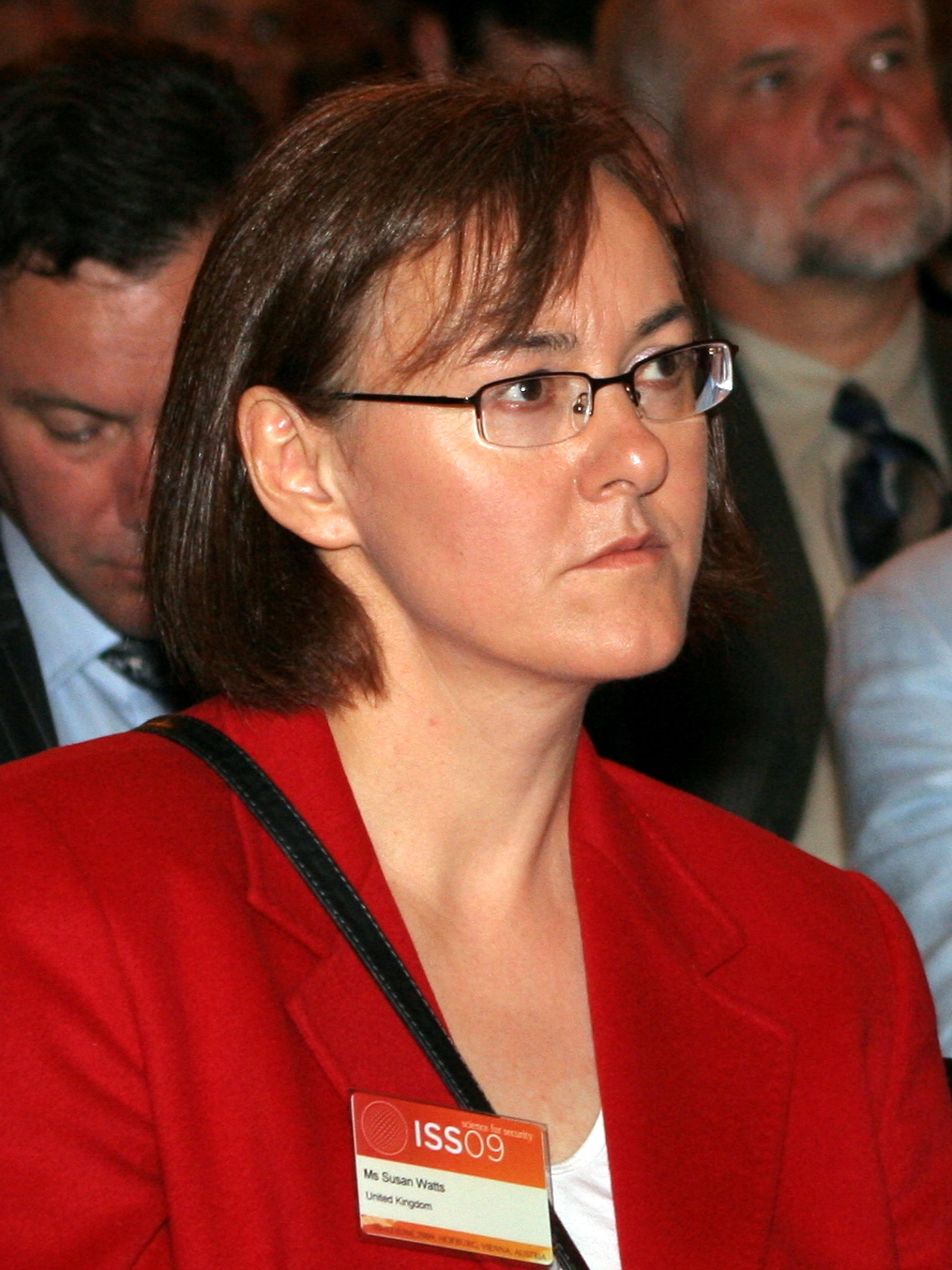
- Susan Watts in 2009
- Born: Susan Janet Watts; 13 July 1962 (age 64); Crystal Palace, London
- Education: Imperial College London (BSc); City University London
- Known for: BBC Newsnight; Science journalism
- Children: 4
- Awards: BAFTA
- Scientific career
- Workplaces: BBC; The Independent; New Scientist; Computer Weekly
- Website: www.twitter.com/susanwatts01

Susan Janet Watts (born 13 July 1962) is a British science journalist. She was science editor of the BBC's Newsnight programme, from January 1995 to November 2013.

== Education ==
Watts was educated at Haberdashers' Aske's Hatcham Girls' School. She has a Bachelor of Science degree in Physics from Imperial College London and a Diploma in Journalism from City University London.

== Career ==
Watts spent ten years in print journalism specialising in scientific topics. She worked for Computer Weekly from 1985 to 1989, New Scientist from 1989 to 1991 and The Independent from 1991 to 1995, before moving into television. She won a BAFTA for her reporting of the BSE "Mad Cow" crisis in British farming. In 2013 she was made redundant from Newsnight when incoming editor Ian Katz decided that the programme no longer required a dedicated science editor.

In 2015 Watts became Head of Public Engagement and Communications at the MRC London Institute of Medical Sciences, Imperial College London.

== Hutton Tribunal ==
Watts came into the limelight in Summer 2003 during the Hutton Inquiry, a judicial inquiry into the death of Biological Weapons expert David Kelly. Kelly had died by suicide after his exposure as the source for a controversial report by fellow BBC journalist Andrew Gilligan, in which it was claimed that the British government had deliberately exaggerated the threat posed by Iraq's Weapons of Mass Destruction in order to justify a war.

On 2 June 2003, Susan Watts broadcast a report in which she extensively quoted a "senior official involved with the process of pulling together the original September 2002 Blair weapons dossier". Her source was Dr Kelly. The thrust of the report was similar to the later Gilligan story, but the key allegations in Watts's report were described in more measured terms and without Gilligan's claim of the direct personal involvement of Alastair Campbell in rewriting the dossier.

Like Gilligan, Watts had spoken to Kelly on an unattributable basis but, unlike Gilligan, she had kept detailed verbatim notes of her conversations, and in one case a tape recording. Watts's notes and recording showed that Kelly had made remarks very similar to those attributed to him by Gilligan; her shorthand notes read:

"A mistake to put it in, Alastair Campbell seeing something in there, single source but not corroborated, sounded good."

She had felt under "considerable internal pressure" to back her employers, despite her own misgivings and as a result she was represented by independent counsel at the Hutton Inquiry. There she told Lord Hutton that she regarded Kelly's remarks about the involvement of Campbell in the strengthening of claims in the dossier as no more than a "glib statement" and a "gossipy aside" for which Kelly had no evidence. Gilligan had decided to make more of similar remarks drawn from his memory of his conversations with Dr Kelly.
