= Sexed up =

English slang phrase

Sexed up refers to making something more sexually attractive. Since 2003 it has been used in the sense of making something more attractive than it really is by selective presentation; a modern update to the phrase "hyped up". One variant of "sexed up" is "sex it up". The implication is that no actual lying is taking place, but that spin is being placed on certain parts of the message.

== History ==
The phrase gained currency in the United Kingdom on 29 May 2003, when BBC defence correspondent Andrew Gilligan filed a report for BBC Radio 4's Today programme in which he stated that an unnamed source, a senior British official, had told him that the September Dossier had been "sexed up", and that the intelligence agencies were concerned about some highly dubious information contained within it—specifically the claim that Saddam Hussein could deploy weapons of mass destruction within 45 minutes of an order. The dubious information was used to make a case for urgent action and to justify the war with Iraq.

== Usage ==
- "One event in particular sours many freshman orientations: sexed-up sex-ed."
- "Some things remain the same, but critics all say that the show was 'sexed up' by the CW for today's audiences."
- In The God Delusion, Richard Dawkins states that pantheism is "sexed up atheism" while "deism is watered-down theism".

== In music ==
- "Sexed Up" is a single released in 2003 by Robbie Williams.

== See also ==
- Cognitive distortion
- Exaggeration
- Hutton inquiry
- September Dossier, the "sexed up" statements leading to the war in Iraq
