= Alyson Bailes =

Alyson Bailes CMG
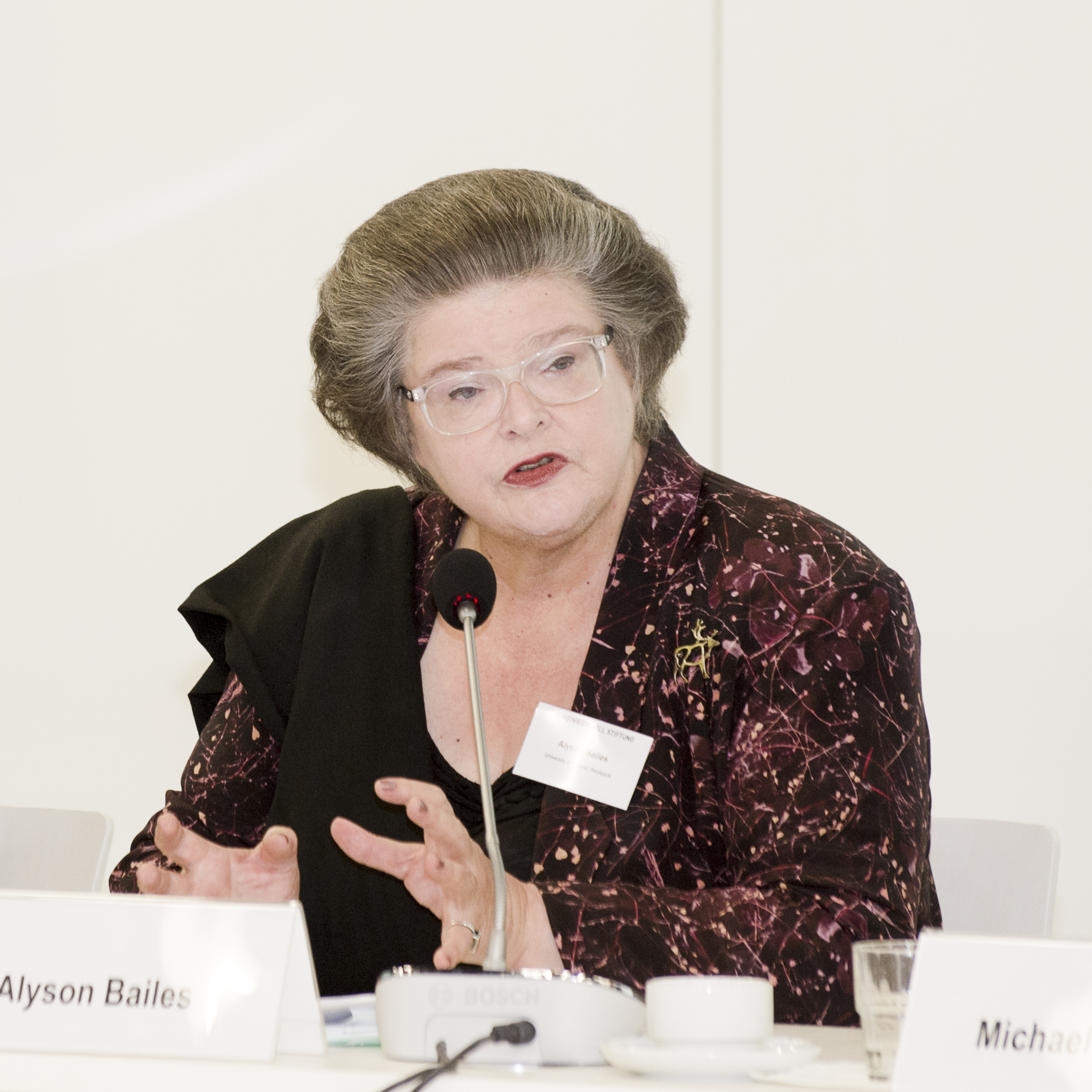
- Bailes at the University of Iceland in 2013

British Ambassador to Finland
- In office November 2000 – June 2002
- Preceded by: Gavin Hewitt
- Succeeded by: Matthew Kirk

Personal details
- Born: Alyson Judith Kirtley Bailes; 5 April 1949 Withington, Manchester
- Died: 29 April 2016 (aged 67) Melrose, Scotland
- Citizenship: United Kingdom
- Party: None
- Education: The Belvedere Academy; Somerville College, Oxford

Alyson Judith Kirtley Bailes CMG (6 April 1949 – 29 April 2016) was a British diplomat, political scientist, academic and polymath.

== Early life ==
Bailes was born on 6 April 1949 in Withington, Manchester. She was the eldest of three children of Barbara (née Martin) and John Lloyd Bailes, both of whom were teachers. She attended The Belvedere School and received a scholarship to Somerville College, Oxford. While at Oxford, she represented her college on University Challenge. She graduated with a Bachelor of Arts degree (first class honours) in Modern History in 1969 and a Master of Arts in 1971.

== Career ==
Bailes joined the London Foreign and Commonwealth Office in 1969 as a desk officer for the Western European Department, and in 1970 received her first international posting as a desk officer at the British Embassy in Budapest. From 1974 to 1976 she served as second secretary in the UK Delegation to NATO. In 1976, she worked in London in the European Community Department (Internal) at the Foreign and Commonwealth Office. She spoke and read French, Hungarian, German, Mandarin Chinese, Norwegian, Finnish and Swedish at what she described as "an operational level". She also had reading knowledge of Danish, Icelandic, Faroese and Dutch.

In March 1979, she was sitting next to the British ambassador Sir Richard Sykes when he was shot dead in his car by the Provisional Irish Republican Army outside his home in The Hague. She went on to speak at a press conference about the incident at the British embassy, then resumed her planned programme of meetings; she was there on a special mission as an assistant to the "Three Wise Men" appointed by the European Council to advise on institutional improvements in advance of Greek accession. In November 1979, Bailes was seconded to the Ministry of Defence as head of section in DS11, a civilian department dealing with defence outside the NATO area. In June 1981 she was posted to a job covering defence issues at the British Embassy in Bonn.

In 1984 she returned to London as Deputy Head of the Policy Planning Staff. From August 1987 to November 1989 she served at the British Embassy in Beijing as Deputy Head of Mission, Consul-General, and a member of the Sino-British Joint Liaison Group on the Future of Hong Kong. From January to July 1990 she took a sabbatical leave to research and write on relations between China and Central and Eastern Europe at Chatham House (the Royal Institute for International Affairs) in London.

From August 1990 until late 1993, she served as Deputy Head of Mission and Consul General at the British Embassy in Oslo. In 1994 she became Head of the Security Policy Department at the Foreign and Commonwealth Office in London. She took a further leave of absence from the British Diplomatic Service to work as vice president for the European Security Programme at the Institute for EastWest Studies (now EastWest Institute) in New York from April 1996 to August 1997. She was then selected as Political Director of the Western European Union in Brussels, where she served from September 1997 to July 2000.

Returning to the Diplomatic Service, Bailes became British Ambassador to Finland from November 2000 to June 2002. She left that appointment, and resigned from the British Service, to take up her post at the Stockholm International Peace Research Institute (SIPRI) from July 2002.

From 2007 to 2015 she was an assistant professor at the University of Iceland. She was a visiting professor at the College of Europe from 2010 to 2015.

From 1990 Bailes published many articles in international journals, and some book chapters, on subjects principally of European defence, regional security cooperation, and arms control. Her main leisure interests were music, travel, and nature study, and she was a keen member of the Dorothy Dunnett Society, for which she wrote articles and a travel guide to Iceland (ISBN 978-0-9570046-2-7). She was a member of the Advisory Council of Independent Diplomat and a fellow of the Scottish Global Forum think tank. In addition she was a visiting professor to the College of Europe, teaching a course in New Security Challenges and Security Governance.

== Death ==
Bailes died of cancer, aged 67, at the Borders General Hospital in Melrose, Scotland.

== Works ==
- "Europe's Defense Challenge: Reinventing the Atlantic Alliance" (January-February 1997), foreignaffairs.com; accessed 4 May 2016.
- "Iceland: The Dorothy Dunnett Guide", dunnettcentral.org, September 2013; accessed 4 May 2016.

== Sources ==
- "Through European Eyes": a collection of Bailes' speeches with writings from young researchers, and a bibliography, University of Iceland (2009)
- Profile, pressreader.com; accessed 4 May 2016.
