= Michael Foley (academic) =

British academic (1948–2016)

- Occupation: Political scientist

Academic background
- Education: University of Essex
- Thesis: The senate liberals, 1959-72 (1977)

Academic work
- Discipline: Political science
- Institutions: University of Aberystwyth
- Doctoral students: Christian Kaunert

Michael Foley (1948–2016) was an international relations scholar and head of the Department of International Politics at Aberystwyth University in Wales, United Kingdom. Foley held a BA from Keele University and an MA and a PhD from the University of Essex. He was the Associate Editor of the journal International Relations. He died in 2016.

== Contribution to the presidentialisation of British politics debate ==
Michael Foley has written two books, namely, The Rise of the British Presidency and The British Presidency: Tony Blair and the Politics of Public Leadership that deal with the presidentialisation of British politics. In these books, Foley argues that various structural developments, changing leadership styles and new power resources have all combined to allow for a British presidency to emerge. Foley makes these arguments by using the American presidency as a point of reference and sees the two offices converging in terms of their wider roles. Moreover, Foley has used the premiership of Tony Blair as a primary case study in his writing. Foley argues that Blair's rise to office was not because of the Labour manifesto as a whole, but because of Blair's own personal vision and pledges. Blair's conduct in office was also based on personal outreach, and his decisions at various points bypassed the parliament and the cabinet. According to Foley, this showcases the leader-centred politics of Britain, which as a whole, has transformed the British Prime Minister into a British president. In addition to Foley’s two foundational pieces on the British presidency, Foley broadened the debate to consider how leadership decline makes the case for the presidentialisation of British politics. Whilst continuing to use Blair’s premiership as a case study, Foley discusses how Blair’s alignment with failed policy initiatives and the decline of his influence in the media contributed to his loss of public support. Furthermore, Foley posits that Blair suffered from a lack of internal support due to his detachment from traditional parliamentary institutions. Foley's body of work is noteworthy because it does not indulge in the classic debate about the cabinet and prime ministerial government and brings about a fresh analysis on the topic.

== Publications ==
- The New Senate: Liberal Influence on a Conservative Institution, 1959–1972. (New Haven: Yale University Press, 1980).
- The Silence of Constitutions: Gaps, 'Abeyances' and Political Temperament in the Maintenance of Government. (London: Routledge, 1989), 186 pp.
- A Government of Laws Men and Machines: Modern American Politics and the Appeal of Newtonian Mechanics (London: Routledge, 1990), 285 pp.
- The Rise of the British Presidency (Manchester: Manchester University Press, 1993), 325 pp.
- The British Presidency: Tony Blair and the Politics of Public Leadership (Manchester: Manchester University Press, 2000), 374 pp.
- "President Bush, the War on Terror and the Populist Tradition", International Politics (Palgrave Macmillan), vol. 44, no. 6 (2007), pp. 666–691.
- American Credo: The Place of Ideas in US Politics (Oxford: Oxford University Press, 2007), 492 pp.
- "Bringing Realism to American Liberalism: Kenneth Waltz and the Process of a Cold War Adjustment". International Relations (Sage), vol. 23, no. 3 (2009), pp. 313–327.
- Political Leadership: Themes, Contexts, and Critiques (Oxford: Oxford University Press, 2013), 416 pp.
