= Hutton Inquiry =

2003 inquiry into death of David Kelly

The Hutton Inquiry was a 2003 judicial inquiry in the UK chaired by Lord Hutton, who was appointed by the Labour government to investigate the controversial circumstances surrounding the death of David Kelly, a biological warfare expert and former UN weapons inspector in Iraq.

On 18 July 2003, Kelly, an employee of the Ministry of Defence, was found dead after he had been named as the source of quotations used by BBC journalist Andrew Gilligan. These quotations had formed the basis of media reports claiming that the government had knowingly "sexed up" the "September Dossier", a report into Iraq and weapons of mass destruction. The inquiry opened in August 2003 and reported on 28 January 2004. The Hutton report cleared the government of wrongdoing, while the BBC was strongly criticised, leading to the resignation of the BBC's chairman Gavyn Davies and the firing of the director-general Greg Dyke. The report was met with scepticism by the British public, and criticism by British newspapers such as The Guardian, Independent, and the Daily Mail, though others said it exposed serious flaws within the BBC.

== Background ==
Kelly had been the source for reports made by three BBC journalists that the government, particularly the press office of Tony Blair, the Prime Minister, had knowingly embellished the dossier with misleading exaggerations of Iraq's military capabilities; specifically, a claim that Iraq had the ability to launch a strike using "weapons of mass destruction" within 45 minutes.

These reports were aired by Andrew Gilligan on BBC Radio 4's Today programme on 29 May 2003, by Gavin Hewitt on the Ten O'Clock News the same day and by Susan Watts on BBC Two's Newsnight on 2 June. On 1 June, Gilligan repeated his allegations in an article written for The Mail on Sunday, naming government press secretary Alastair Campbell as the driving force for alteration of the dossier.

The government denounced the reports and accused the BBC of poor journalism. In subsequent weeks the corporation stood by the report, saying that it had a reliable source. Following intense media speculation, Kelly was finally named in the press as the source for Gilligan's story on 9 July.

Kelly died by suicide in a field close to his home on 17 July. An inquiry was announced by the British government the following day. The inquiry was to investigate "the circumstances surrounding the death of Dr Kelly".

== The inquiry ==
The inquiry opened on 1 August. Hearings began on 11 August. The first phase of the inquiry closed on 4 September. A second session of witness-calling began on Monday 15 September, where some witnesses from the first session, such as Andrew Gilligan, Defence Secretary Geoff Hoon, BBC chairman Gavyn Davies and Alastair Campbell were recalled for further questions arising from the first phase, and some witnesses were called for the first time. The taking of evidence closed on Wednesday 24 September. The inquiry heard evidence on 22 days, lasting 110 hours, from 74 witnesses. Examination and cross-examination came from five Queen's Counsels. Representing the Inquiry was James Dingemans QC (now Mr Justice Dingemans) and Peter Knox (now KC). Representing the government was Jonathan Sumption (now Lord Sumption). Andrew Caldecott QC represented the BBC.

At the conclusion of the Inquiry there was widespread approval of the process conducted by Hutton. The Inquiry had provided exceptional access to the inner workings of the UK Government and the BBC. Virtually all the documentation provided to the Inquiry was quickly provided to the public on the Inquiry's website.

British ambassador David Broucher reported a conversation with Dr Kelly at a meeting in Geneva in February 2003, which he described as "from a very deep memory hole". Broucher related that Kelly said he had assured his Iraqi sources that there would be no war if they co-operated, and that a war would put him in an "ambiguous" moral position. Broucher had asked Kelly what would happen if Iraq were invaded, and Kelly had replied, "I will probably be found dead in the woods." Broucher then quoted from an email he had sent just after Kelly's death: "I did not think much of this at the time, taking it to be a hint that the Iraqis might try to take revenge against him, something that did not seem at all fanciful then. I now see that he may have been thinking on rather different lines."

== The report ==
Hutton initially announced that he expected to be able to deliver his report in late November or early December. The report was eventually published on 28 January 2004. It ran to 750 pages in 13 chapters and 18 appendices, though this was mainly composed of excerpts from the hundreds of documents (letters, emails, transcripts of conversation, and so on) that were published during the inquiry. The main conclusions were:

- Nobody could have anticipated that Dr Kelly would take his life
- There was "no underhand [government] strategy" to name him as the source for the BBC's accusations
- Gilligan's original accusation was "unfounded" and the BBC's editorial and management processes were "defective"
- The dossier had not been "sexed up", but was in line with available intelligence, although the Joint Intelligence Committee, chaired by John Scarlett, may have been "subconsciously influenced" by the government
- The Ministry of Defence (MOD) was at fault for not informing Dr Kelly of its strategy that would involve naming him

The report exonerated the government much more completely than had been expected by many observers prior to its publication. Evidence presented to the inquiry had indicated:

- That the wording of the dossier had been altered to present the strongest possible case for war within the bounds of available intelligence
- That some of these changes had been suggested by Alastair Campbell
- That reservations had been expressed by experts within the Intelligence Community about the wording of the dossier
- That David Kelly had direct contact with dissenters within the Defence Intelligence Staff and had communicated their reservations (and his own) to several journalists.
- That, following Dr Kelly's decision to come forward as one of Gilligan's contacts, Alastair Campbell and Geoff Hoon had wanted his identity made public
- That the Prime Minister himself had chaired a meeting at which it was decided that Dr Kelly's name would be confirmed by the Ministry of Defence if put to them by journalists
- That Dr Kelly's name had been confirmed after journalists had made multiple suggestions to the MOD press office.

Despite this evidence, Hutton's report largely cleared the government of any wrongdoing. In large measure this was because Hutton judged that the government had not known of the reservations in the intelligence community: it seemed they had been discounted by senior intelligence assessors (the Joint Intelligence Committee) — thus Gilligan's claim that the government "probably knew" the intelligence was flawed, was itself unfounded. Furthermore, the Inquiry heard that these were not the words used by Gilligan's source, but Gilligan's own inference. However, the judgement that No. 10 was not aware of the reservations of the intelligence community was not supported by other evidence contained in the report, such as the transcript of an interview given by David Kelly to BBC journalist Susan Watts. In addition to clearing the government, Hutton determined that any failure of intelligence assessments fell outside his remit, and the Intelligence Services thus also escaped censure.

Instead the report placed a great deal of emphasis on evidence of the failings of Gilligan and the BBC, many of which had been explicitly acknowledged during the course of the Inquiry. Gilligan, for example, admitted and apologised for surreptitiously briefing politicians on a select committee in order to put pressure on Dr Kelly. Gilligan, whilst disagreeing with the overall thrust of the report, also admitted that he had attributed inferences to Dr Kelly which were in fact his own.

The Inquiry specifically criticised the chain of management that caused the BBC to defend its story. The BBC management, the report said, had accepted Gilligan's word that his story was accurate, in spite of his notes being incomplete.

Davies had then told the BBC Board of Governors that he was happy with the story, and told the Prime Minister that a satisfactory internal inquiry had taken place. The Board of Governors, under Davies' guidance, accepted that further investigation of the government's complaints were unnecessary. In his report Hutton wrote of this:

The Governors should have recognised more fully than they did that their duty to protect the independence of the BBC was not incompatible with giving proper consideration to whether there was validity in the Government's complaints, no matter how strongly worded by Mr Campbell, that the allegations against its integrity reported in Mr Gilligan's broadcasts were unfounded and the Governors failed to give this issue proper consideration.

There was considerable speculation in the media that the report had been deliberately written to clear the government, a claim disputed by Lord Hutton at a later press conference. Many people remain convinced that this was the case. Suggestions of whitewash were supported by Hutton's careful choice of language at certain points in the report. For example, he argued that the use of the phrase "sexed up" by Gilligan would have been taken by the general public to indicate an outright lie rather than mere exaggeration, and thus the claim was untrue.

== Aftermath of publication ==
It was because of the report's criticism of his actions that Gavyn Davies resigned on the day of publication, 28 January 2004. Reporters from rival news organisation ITN described the day of publication as "one of the worst in the BBC's history". Two days after the publication of the report, at a meeting of BBC Governors where it is reported he only retained the support of one-third of the board Greg Dyke, the director-general, initially offered his resignation before withdrawing the offer. The Board of Governors then fired Dyke after which he unsuccessfully demanded his job back. However he publicly announced that he had resigned. Dyke stated:

I do not necessarily accept the findings of Lord Hutton.

Andrew Gilligan resigned because of his part in the affair on 30 January. However, in his resignation statement he questioned the value of Hutton's report:

This report casts a chill over all journalism, not just the BBC's. It seeks to hold reporters, with all the difficulties they face, to a standard that it does not appear to demand of, for instance, Government dossiers.

Blair, who had been repeatedly under fire for the "sexing-up" allegations, told the House of Commons in the debate following the release of the report that he had been completely exonerated. He demanded a retraction from those who had accused him of lying to the House, particularly Michael Howard, the Leader of the Opposition:

The allegation that I or anyone else lied to this House or deliberately misled the country by falsifying intelligence on WMD is itself the real lie. And I simply ask that those that made it and those who have repeated it over all these months, now withdraw it, fully, openly and clearly.

Howard sidestepped the demand for an apology. However, immediately after the Board of Governors had accepted Dyke's resignation, Lord Ryder, as Acting Chairman of the BBC, apologised "unreservedly" for errors made during the affair. Dyke, who had not given the conclusions of the Hutton report his full backing, said that he "could not quite work out" what the BBC was apologising for. The Independent subsequently reported that the BBC governors had ignored the advice of BBC lawyers that the Hutton report was "legally flawed". Although this was denied by the BBC, it was confirmed in 2007 when the BBC was forced to publish minutes of a governors meeting at the BBC that took place directly after the Hutton report.

At the end of the report Hutton recalled how the final part of David Kelly's life had not been representative of his entire career in the civil service:

The evidence at this Inquiry has concentrated largely on the last two months of Dr Kelly's life, and therefore it is fitting that I should end this report with some words written in Dr Kelly's obituary in The Independent on 31 July by Mr Terence Taylor, the President and Executive Director of the International Institute of Strategic Studies, Washington DC, and a former colleague of Dr Kelly: "It is most important that the extraordinary public attention and political fallout arising from the events of the past month do not mask the extraordinary achievements of a scientist who loyally served not only his Government but also the international community at large."

Deliberately or otherwise, Dr Kelly had raised wider questions about the quality, interpretation and presentation of intelligence that Hutton had left unanswered. Some of these were to be addressed in a new inquiry, announced by the government on 3 February 2004. Amongst other things, the Butler Report concluded that "the fact that the reference to the 45 minute claim in the classified assessment was repeated in the dossier later led to suspicions that it had been included because of its eye-catching character". Andrew Gilligan claims that this has vindicated his original story that the dossier had been "sexed up".

Over a dozen years later, the Chilcot Inquiry came to different conclusions. The Financial Times reported, "Every previous inquiry into Britain's decision to invade Iraq has swiftly been condemned by the public as a "whitewash". Such a description hardly applies to the monumental inquest that has been published by Sir John Chilcot."

== Leaking of the report prior to publication ==
The report was leaked by an unknown party to The Sun the night before the official publication date. The Sun and consequently most other newspapers in their later editions ran with the leaked version of the report. Delivered by an unnamed source over the telephone to Sun political editor Trevor Kavanagh, the leaked version accurately described the report's main findings. All sides involved in the Inquiry denounced the leak. Lord Hutton launched a further inquiry into how the report came to be leaked. This second inquiry, carried out by a solicitor, reported on 11 August 2004, but failed to find the source of the leak. It also said there were "no particular weaknesses" in the security of the report and so offered no suggestions of how a similar leak might be prevented in the future.

== Media reaction to the report ==
The cover of The Independent when the report was released: "Whitewash? The Hutton Report".

Several national newspapers judged the report to be so uncritical of the government that they accused Hutton of participating in an "establishment whitewash". The Daily Mail wrote in its editorial "We're faced with the wretched spectacle of the BBC chairman resigning while Alastair Campbell crows from the summit of his dunghill. Does this verdict, my lord, serve the real interest of truth?". The Independent included a large, mostly empty, white space above the fold on its front page containing the word "whitewash?" in small red type.

The Daily Express headline read "Hutton's whitewash leaves questions unanswered" — referring to the fact that an investigation into Britain's reasons for joining the war in Iraq was beyond the scope of the inquiry. None of the newspapers presented evidence of a cover-up, but they questioned whether the conclusions were supported by the evidence.

Other newspapers such as The Times, The Sun (both owned by News Corporation and usually critical of the BBC) and The Daily Telegraph concentrated on the behaviour of the BBC criticised in the report and called for Greg Dyke to resign, as he did later that day (29 January). The Sunday Times depicted Lord Hutton as the three wise monkeys who would 'see no evil, hear no evil and speak no evil'.

The reactions of papers supportive of the Conservative Party, such as The Daily Mail and The Daily Telegraph, in part reflected the Conservatives' disappointment that the report did not find that Blair had misled the House of Commons or the public, which might have precipitated his resignation. On the other hand, left-wing newspapers such as The Guardian and The Daily Mirror, while supporting Blair against the Conservatives, strongly opposed British participation in the war in Iraq, and sympathised with what they (and many others) saw as the anti-war stance of BBC journalists such as Gilligan. While they probably did not want Blair forced from office, they would have welcomed a finding that Alastair Campbell had falsified the September Dossier.

Martin Kettle wrote in The Guardian on 3 February: "Too many newspapers invested too heavily in a particular preferred outcome on these key points. They wanted the government found guilty on the dossier and on the naming, and they wanted Gilligan's reporting vindicated. When Hutton drew opposite conclusions, they damned his findings as perverse and his report as a whitewash. But the report's weakness was its narrowness, and to some extent its unworldliness, not the accuracy of its verdicts."

Thousands of BBC workers paid for a full-page advertisement in The Daily Telegraph on 31 January in order to publish a message of support for Dyke, followed by a list of their names. The message read:

The following statement is from BBC employees, presenters, reporters and contributors. It was paid for by them personally, not the BBC itself.
Greg Dyke stood for brave, independent BBC journalism that was fearless in its search for the truth. We are resolute that the BBC should not step back from its determination to investigate the facts in pursuit of the truth. Through his passion and integrity Greg Dyke inspired us to make programmes of the highest quality and creativity. We are dismayed by Greg's departure, but we are determined to maintain his achievements and his vision for an independent organisation that serves the public above all else.

An ICM public opinion poll, commissioned by the News of the World and published on 1 February 2004, showed that 54% of respondents believed Tony Blair's reputation had deteriorated. Only 14% thought his status had improved after being vindicated in the report.

In some countries the reputation of the BBC in fact improved as a result of its attacks on the British government during the Kelly affair. The BBC's willingness to accuse the Prime Minister and the Ministry of Defence so publicly of wrongdoing, despite the mistakes the BBC itself acknowledged it had made, boosted its credentials as an impartial and unbiased news source.

Hutton himself defended the report, speaking before a Commons select committee on 14 May 2004. He stated he had not thought it appropriate to embark on a study of the pre-war intelligence: "I had to draw the line somewhere." He felt the allegations against Gilligan were "far graver" than questions concerning the quality of the intelligence, and that it was right that a separate inquiry, the Butler Review, was being conducted. In November 2006 he dismissed the media claims that his report was a whitewash, saying:

I knew that if I delivered a report concluding that the government had deliberately misled the country about the existence of weapons of mass destruction in Iraq and had acted towards Dr Kelly in a dishonourable and underhand way, I would be acclaimed in many sections of the media as a fearless and independent judge. I also knew that if I did not come to such findings it was probable that my report would be subjected to considerable criticism.

The notoriety of the Hutton Report received a boost when Cherie Blair was reported to have auctioned off a signed copy of the report for £400 for the benefit of the Labour Party in May 2006.

== Criticism ==
=== Fatality of ulnar artery cuts ===
Although suicide was officially accepted as the cause of death, some medical experts have raised doubts, suggesting that the evidence does not support this. The most detailed objection was provided in a letter from three medical doctors published in The Guardian, reinforced by support from two other senior doctors in a later letter to the newspaper. These doctors argued that the post-mortem finding of a transected ulnar artery could not have caused a degree of blood loss that would kill someone, particularly when outside in the cold (where vasoconstriction would cause slow blood loss). Further, this conflicted with the minimal amount of blood found at the scene. They also contended that the amount of co-proxamol found was only about a third of what would normally be fatal. Dr Rouse, a British epidemiologist wrote to the British Medical Journal offering his opinion that the act of committing suicide by severing the wrist arteries is an extremely rare occurrence in a 59-year-old man with no previous psychiatric history.

In December 2010 The Times reported that Kelly had a rare abnormality in the arteries supplying his heart; the information had been disclosed by the head of the Academic Unit of Pathology at Sheffield University Medical School, Professor Paul Ince, who noted that the post-mortem had found severe narrowing of the blood vessels, and said that heart disease was likely to have been a factor in Kelly's death as the cut to the wrist artery would not itself have been fatal. Vice-President of the British Cardiovascular Society Ian Simpson said that Kelly's artery anomaly could have contributed to his death.

Dave Bartlett and Vanessa Hunt, the two paramedics who were called to the scene of Kelly's death, have since spoken publicly with their opinion that there was not enough blood at the location to justify the belief that he had died from blood loss. Bartlett and Hunt told The Guardian that they had seen a small amount of blood on plants near Kelly's body and a patch of blood the size of a coin on his trousers. They said they would expect to find several pints of blood at the scene of a suicide involving an arterial cut. Two forensic pathologists, Chris Milroy of Sheffield University and Guy Rutty of Leicester University, dismissed the paramedics' claims, saying it is hard to judge blood loss from the scene of a death, as some blood may have seeped into the ground. Milroy also told The Guardian that Kelly's heart condition may have made it hard for him to sustain any significant degree of blood loss.

On 15 October 2007 it was discovered, through a Freedom of Information request, that the knife had no fingerprints on it, nor were fingerprints retrieved from the medication blister pack or Kelly's mobile phone.

=== Alternative theories for Kelly's death ===
The BBC broadcast a programme on Kelly on 25 February 2007 as part of the series The Conspiracy Files; the network commissioned an opinion poll to establish the views of the public on his death. 22.7% of those surveyed thought Kelly had not killed himself, 38.8% of people believed he had, and 38.5% said they did not know. On 19 May 2006 Norman Baker, Liberal Democrat MP for Lewes, who had previously investigated the Hinduja affair, which led to the second resignation of Peter Mandelson, announced that he had been investigating "unanswered questions" from the official inquiry into Kelly's death. He later announced that he had uncovered evidence to show that Kelly did not die from natural causes. In July 2006, Baker claimed that his hard drive had been wiped remotely. Baker's book The Strange Death of David Kelly was serialised in the Daily Mail before publication in November 2007. In his book, Baker argued that Kelly did not commit suicide. Kelly's family expressed their displeasure at the publication; his sister-in-law said: "It is just raking over old bones. I can't speak for the whole family, but I've read it all [Baker's theories], every word, and I don't believe it."

On 5 December 2009 six doctors began legal action to demand a formal inquest into the death, saying there was "insufficient evidence to prove beyond reasonable doubt he killed himself". In January 2010, it was disclosed that Hutton had requested that all files relating to the postmortem remain secret for 70 years. Hutton said this was to protect Kelly's family from the distress of further media reports about the death, saying: "My request was not a concealment of evidence because every matter of relevance had been examined or was available for examination during the public inquiry. There was no secrecy surrounding the postmortem report because it had always been available for examination and questioning by counsel representing the interested parties during the inquiry."

In 2010 Attorney General Dominic Grieve was said to be considering an inquiry to review the suicide finding. Early that August, a group of nine experts, including former coroners and a professor of intensive-care medicine, wrote a letter to the newspaper The Times questioning Lord Hutton's verdict. On 14 August 2010, Jennifer Dyson, a retired pathologist, amplified the criticism, saying that a coroner would probably have recorded an open verdict in the absence of absolute proof that suicide was intended. She cast further doubt on the circumstances surrounding the death of Kelly, and also criticised Hutton's handling of the inquiry. She joined other experts questioning the official finding that Kelly had bled to death and argued that it was more likely that he had suffered a heart attack due to the stress he had been placed under. This intervention came as Michael Howard, the former Conservative Party leader, became the most prominent politician to call for a full inquest into Kelly's death.

=== The Strange Death of David Kelly ===
In his 2007 book The Strange Death of David Kelly, shortlisted for the Channel 4 Political Book Award 2008, Norman Baker (at the time an MP) argued that Kelly was almost certainly murdered. He described the police investigation and Hutton Inquiry as a 'farce', which failed to investigate numerous discrepancies and anomalies in the physical, medical and witness evidence.

Baker concluded that Kelly's death was probably a revenge killing by Iraqi supporters of Saddam Hussein, and that it was crudely disguised as a suicide by Thames Valley police – who appeared to have known of an assassination plot in advance – because the British government was fearful of the political consequences. He noted that many of those apparently involved have since received promotions or unusual awards. Baker later stated that more detail about this had to be removed from the book.

While investigating Kelly's death, Baker claimed he had experienced strange events, including apparent intimidation of a woman who was assisting him, and the unexplained wiping of his computer's hard drive.

=== Medical criticisms and calls for inquest ===
Throughout 2004 there were frequent questions from medical practitioners, as well as ambulance crew on the scene, about the veracity of the verdict of suicide. They said that it was extremely unusual to die as a result of cutting the ulnar artery – Kelly being the only supposed case of this occurring in 2003 – and that almost no blood was found at the scene.

In August 2010, nine leading doctors and forensic experts wrote to The Daily Telegraph calling for a full inquest, on the grounds that the cause of death claimed was extremely unlikely and had not been properly investigated by the Hutton Inquiry. Former Conservative party leader Michael Howard backed their call for an inquest.

In June 2011, Attorney General Dominic Grieve ruled out applying to the High Court for an inquest, saying that the evidence Kelly had committed suicide was "overwhelming". This was greeted with outrage by the group of doctors campaigning for an inquest, whose leader, Dr Stephen Frost, said the government was "complicit in a determined and concerted cover-up". He added:

The continuing cover-up of the truth of what happened is a national disgrace and should be of concern to all British citizens... It is highly regrettable that Dominic Grieve has sought, as did the coroner Nicholas Gardiner before him, to rubber-stamp the clear subversion of due process of the law that the derailing of the inquest by Lord Falconer on August 13, 2003 constituted.

He said that the doctors would seek a judicial review of the decision not to pursue an inquest. The High Court rejected a judicial review in December of that year.

== See also ==
- Butler Review
- Iraq Inquiry
- List of political scandals in the United Kingdom
