= John Scarlett =

British senior intelligence officer (born 1948)

Sir John Scarlett KCMG OBE
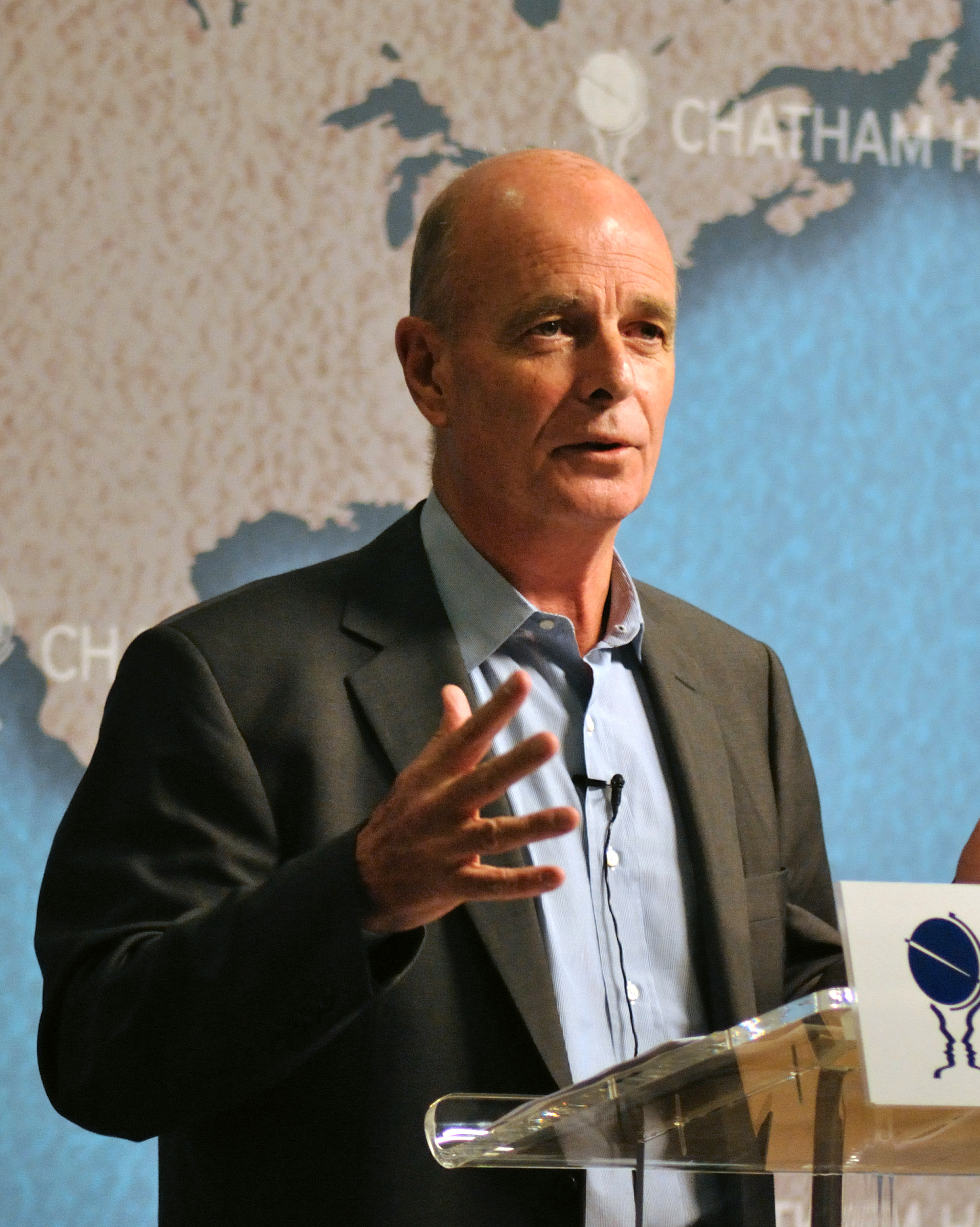
- Scarlett speaking at a Chatham House event in 2011

14th Chief of the Secret Intelligence Service
- In office 2004–2009
- Preceded by: Richard Dearlove
- Succeeded by: John Sawers

Chairman of the Joint Intelligence Committee
- In office 2001–2004
- Preceded by: Peter Ricketts
- Succeeded by: Richard Mottram

Personal details
- Born: John McLeod Scarlett; 18 August 1948 (age 78) Southwark, London, England
- Education: Magdalen College, Oxford
- Occupation: Intelligence officer
- John Scarlett's voice from the BBC programme MI6 A Century in the Shadows, 2009

Sir John McLeod Scarlett KCMG OBE (born 18 August 1948) is a British senior intelligence officer. He was Chief of the Secret Intelligence Service (MI6) from 2004 to 2009. Prior to this appointment, he had chaired the Joint Intelligence Committee (JIC).

== Biography ==
Scarlett was born in Southwark. Fluent in French and Russian, Scarlett was educated at Epsom College and Magdalen College, Oxford, where in 1970 he received a first class degree in history.

In 1968, Scarlett was at Grosvenor Square during a protest against the Vietnam War in front of the United States Embassy and wrote to The Times at the time, criticising the police action.

Shortly afterward, in 1971, he was recruited by MI6 and served in Moscow, Nairobi (1973–1976), and Paris. In 1994, after a tit-for-tat row between the British and Russian authorities, Scarlett was expelled from Moscow where he had been MI6's station chief. He later became Director of Security and Public Affairs.

== Joint Intelligence Committee ==
Scarlett took on the role of head of the JIC one week before the September 11 attacks.

The normally secretive intelligence services were thrust into the public gaze in the Summer of 2003 after the death of the eminent government weapons expert, Dr David Kelly. Kelly had been found dead in the Oxfordshire countryside near his home, after being exposed as the source of allegations that the government had "sexed-up" intelligence regarding existence of weapons of mass destruction in Iraq prior to the 2003 invasion of Iraq. The "classic case" was the claim that Iraq could launch Weapons of Mass Destruction "within 45 minutes of an order to do so"—Dr Kelly had privately dismissed this as "risible".

Scarlett gave evidence at the Hutton Inquiry into the circumstances surrounding Kelly's death. It became clear that Scarlett had worked closely with Alastair Campbell, then British Prime Minister Tony Blair's Director of Communications and Strategy, on the controversial September Dossier, with Campbell making drafting suggestions which the inquiry found may have "subconsciously influenced" Scarlett and the JIC. This influence may have had deleterious effects on the quality of the assessments presented in the dossier. For instance, the Intelligence and Security Committee of Parliament made several criticisms in their report "Iraqi Weapons of Mass Destruction: Intelligence and Assessments":

"As the 45 minutes claim was new to its readers, the context of the intelligence and any assessment needed to be explained. The fact that it was assessed to refer to battlefield chemical and biological munitions and their movement on the battlefield, not to any other form of chemical or biological attack, should have been highlighted in the dossier. The omission of the context and assessment allowed speculation as to its exact meaning. This was unhelpful to an understanding of this issue."

Scarlett became the head of SIS on 6 May 2004, before publication of the findings of the Butler Review. Although the review highlighted many failings in the intelligence behind the Iraq war and the workings of the Joint Intelligence Committee, it specifically stated that Scarlett should not resign as head of the Committee and SIS.

On 8 December 2009, Scarlett gave evidence to the Iraq Inquiry. He denied he was under any pressure to "firm up" the September Dossier, and claimed there was "no conscious intention" to mislead about Iraq's weapons but it would have been "better" to have clarified battlefield munitions not missiles were meant.

On 26 June 2011, The Guardian reported on a memo from Scarlett to Blair's foreign affairs adviser, released under the Freedom of Information Act 2000, which referred to "the benefit of obscuring the fact that in terms of WMD Iraq is not that exceptional". The memo has been described as one of the most significant documents on the September dossier yet published as it is considered a proposal to mislead the public.

== Post-retirement ==
On 28 January 2011, Scarlett was appointed to the board of Times Newspapers Ltd, part of News International, which publishes The Times and The Sunday Times. He has previously been a governor of Epsom College, and is the former chairman of the Bletchley Park Trust.

== Honours and controversy ==
Scarlett was appointed an Officer of the Order of the British Empire (OBE) in the 1987 Birthday Honours and a Companion of the Order of St Michael and St George (CMG) in the 2001 New Year Honours.

He was promoted to Knight Commander of the Order of St Michael and St George (KCMG) in the 2007 New Year Honours. Scarlett, while Chairman of the JIC, was the principal author of the assessments on which the September Dossier was based, a document partly by which Tony Blair justified to Parliament the invasion of Iraq and which was later found to be "flawed" by the Butler Review.

== In popular culture ==
In the 2022 ITVX miniseries Litvinenko, Scarlett was portrayed by Simon Paisley Day.

Government offices
Preceded by Sir Peter Ricketts	Chairman of the Joint Intelligence Committee; 2001–2004	Succeeded by Sir Richard Mottram; Permanent Secretary, Intelligence, Security and Resilience
Preceded by Sir Richard Dearlove	Chief of the SIS; 2004–2009	Succeeded by Sir John Sawers
