= Christian Kaunert =

German-British political scientist

- Citizenship: UK
- Occupation: Political scientist
- Known for: Jean Monnet professor

Academic background
- Education: Aberystwyth University
- Thesis: The European Commission: an 'engine' in the area of freedom, security and justice? (2006)
- Doctoral advisor: Michael Foley

Academic work
- Discipline: Security studies
- Sub-discipline: EU counter-terrorism
- Institutions: Dublin City University; University of South Wales; Vrije Universiteit Brussel; University of Dundee; University of Salford; Maastricht University
- Doctoral students: Steven Stottlemyre

Christian Kaunert is a German-Irish-British political scientist and Jean Monnet professor specialised in European security. Kaunert is professor of international security at Dublin City University and professor of policing and security at the University of South Wales, where he holds a Jean Monnet chair of EU counter-terrorism and directs a Jean Monnet Centre of Excellence. He is also the co-ordinator of a research-focused Jean Monnet Network of EU counter-terrorism, which brings together fourteen universities and research centres across Europe and its neighbourhood. Kaunert has published extensively in the field of European security, and also collaborated with major international news outlets as an expert in security, migration and counter-terrorism.

== Academic career ==
Kaunert started his academic career as a lecturer in European politics at Aberystwyth University, where he obtained his PhD, with a thesis entitled The European Commission: an 'engine' in the area of freedom, security and justice?, in 2006. After a brief spell as a lecturer at the University of Maastricht, he moved to the UK in 2007 as a lecturer and senior lecturer at the University of Salford, where he earned his first Jean Monnet chair in 2012. While at Salford, he was also Marie Curie senior research fellow at the European University Institute in Florence from 2010 to 2012. At the end of 2012 he left for the University of Dundee in Scotland, where he established his first Jean Monnet Centre of Excellence in 2013, and was appointed professor in 2014. Kaunert then moved back to continental Europe in 2016 as professor and academic director of the Institute for European Studies of Vrije Universiteit Brussel, until he returned to the UK as a professor and director of the International Centre for Policing & Security at the University of South Wales in 2018. In 2021, he was appointed Professor of International Security at Dublin City University in Ireland.

== Selected works ==
- Kaunert, C. (2010). European internal security: towards supranational governance in the area of freedom, security and justice. Manchester University Press.
- Kaunert, C. & Zwolski, K. (2013). The EU as a global security actor–a comprehensive analysis beyond CFSP and JHA. Palgrave Macmillan.
- Léonard, S., & Kaunert, C. (2019). Refugees, security and the European Union. Routledge.
- Ilbiz, E., & Kaunert, C. (2021). EU, Turkey and Counter-Terrorism: Fighting the PKK and ISIS. Edward Elgar
