= The Strange Death of David Kelly =

2007 book by Norman Baker

- Cover
- Author: Norman Baker
- Language: English
- Subject: Death of David Kelly
- Published: London
- Publisher: Methuen
- Publication date: 2007
- Publication place: United Kingdom
- Media type: Print (Paperback)
- Pages: 399
- ISBN: 9781842752173
- Dewey Decimal: 941.086

The Strange Death of David Kelly is a 2007 book by British politician Norman Baker.

== Synopsis ==
Baker investigates the death of David Kelly. Kelly was a British scientist and authority on biological warfare, employed by the Ministry of Defence and formerly a United Nations weapons inspector in Iraq. He had an off-record discussion with a BBC journalist concerning a British government dossier about weapons of mass destruction in Iraq, which was cited by the journalist. Kelly's name became subsequently known and he was aggressively questioned by a Parliamentary committee. He was found dead two days later, attributed to suicide. In the book, Baker disputes this version of events and suggests Kelly was murdered. Baker stated 'I am convinced beyond a reasonable doubt that this could not be suicide. The medical evidence does not support it and David Kelly's state of mind and personality suggests otherwise. It was not an accident so I am left with the conclusion that it is murder.'

== Reception ==
In The Guardian Richard Norton-Taylor wrote 'there is no evidence supporting the many theories that Kelly was murdered and plenty of evidence supporting the conclusion that he was driven to suicide'; however he also wrote 'Baker may have done a service by reminding us of one of the nastiest episodes arising from the invasion of Iraq'. The book was also serialised in The Daily Mail. Additionally, the book was reviewed by Nigel Jones in The Daily Telegraph.
