= Scottish legislation =

Scottish legislation refers to primary and secondary legislation applicable to Scotland, passed by the pre-Union Scottish parliament, the Parliament of Great Britain, the Parliament of the United Kingdom or the devolved Scottish Parliament. See:

- List of acts of the Parliament of Scotland
- List of acts of the Scottish Parliament
- Scottish statutory instrument

== See also ==
- List of European Union directives
