= Butler Review =

2004 UK government review on intelligence on WMDs in Iraq

The Review of Intelligence on Weapons of Mass Destruction, widely known as the Butler Review or Butler Inquiry after its chairman Robin Butler, Baron Butler of Brockwell, refers to an inquiry into intelligence on Iraq's weapons of mass destruction, which played a key part in the British Government's decision to invade Iraq (as part of the U.S.-led coalition) in 2003.

The Review was announced on 3 February 2004 by the Foreign and Commonwealth Secretary, in the House of Commons, and published on 14 July 2004. A similar Iraq Intelligence Commission was set up in the United States.

The inquiry also dealt with the wider issue of WMD programmes in "countries of concern" and the global trade in WMD. Recommendations were made to the prime minister to better evaluate and assess intelligence information in the future before invoking action.

== The committee ==
Lord Butler of Brockwell headed the five-member committee which included senior parliamentarians and civil servants with military and intelligence links:

- Lord Butler of Brockwell, career civil servant who served three prime ministers as Cabinet Secretary.
- Field Marshal Peter Inge, Baron Inge, a crossbencher who was Chief of the Defence Staff from 1994 to 1997.
- Sir John Chilcot, a career diplomat and top civil servant.
- Ann Taylor, Labour MP who supported the invasion of Iraq, was chair of the Commons Intelligence and Security Committee (ISC), and former chief whip of the Labour Party.
- Michael Mates Conservative MP who supported the invasion of Iraq, chair of the Northern Ireland select committee. He was also a member of the ISC.

The Butler Review followed procedures similar to the Franks Committee inquiry into the Falklands War. The inquiry had access to all intelligence reports and other government papers, and it could call witnesses to give oral evidence. It worked closely with the US inquiry and the Iraq Survey Group. The committee met in secret and only its conclusions were published on 14 July 2004.

== Background ==
The British government followed US President George W. Bush who had created a similar Iraq Intelligence Commission one day earlier. The Butler Inquiry's remit did not extend to an examination of the political decision making process.

== Controversy ==
The Liberal Democrats opted not to take part, because the role of politicians had been excluded from the Inquiry's remit. (Senior Lib Dem MP Alan Beith was to have been the sixth member of the panel). Explaining their position Foreign Affairs spokesman Sir Menzies Campbell asked the prime minister:

Don't you understand ... that following the public response to the Hutton report that an inquiry that excludes politicians from scrutiny is unlikely to command public confidence...

On 1 March 2004 the Conservative Party announced that they would not be taking part in the inquiry either. Conservative leader Michael Howard said that this was because Lord Butler of Brockwell's interpretation of the terms of reference were "unacceptably restrictive". Conservative member Michael Mates stated that he would remain on the committee.

Over a dozen years later, the Chilcot Inquiry report came to different conclusions. The Financial Times reported, 'Every previous inquiry into Britain's decision to invade Iraq has swiftly been condemned by the public as a "whitewash". Such a description hardly applies to the monumental inquest that has been published by Sir John Chilcot.'

== Conclusions of the Review ==
The review was published on 14 July 2004. Its main conclusion was that key intelligence used to justify the war with Iraq was unreliable. The Secret Intelligence Service did not check its sources well enough and sometimes relied on third-hand reports. There was an over-reliance on Iraqi dissident sources. Warnings from the Joint Intelligence Committee on the limitations of the intelligence were not made clear. Overall the report said that "more weight was placed on the intelligence than it could bear", and that judgements had stretched available intelligence "to the outer limits".

Information from another country's intelligence service on Iraqi production of chemical and biological weapons was "seriously flawed", without naming the country. It says that there was no recent intelligence to demonstrate that Iraq was a greater threat than other countries, and that the lack of any success in the UNMOVIC finding WMDs should have prompted a re-think. It states that Tony Blair's policy towards Iraq shifted because of the attacks of 11 September 2001, not because of Iraq's weapons programme, and that the government's language left the impression that there was "fuller and firmer intelligence" than was the case.

The report indicated that there was enough intelligence to make a "well-founded" judgment that Saddam Hussein was seeking, perhaps as late as 2002, to obtain uranium illegally from Niger and the Democratic Republic of Congo. In particular, referring to a 1999 visit of Iraqi officials to Niger, the report states: "The British government had intelligence from several different sources indicating that this visit was for the purpose of acquiring uranium. Since uranium constitutes almost three-quarters of Niger's exports, the intelligence was credible."

Stauber and Rampton, however, noted that "the Butler Report offers no details—not even an approximate date when this may have happened, thus giving no way to assess its credibility. The British have also declined to share any information about this intelligence, even with the International Atomic Energy Agency, which was responsible for prewar monitoring of Iraq's nuclear capability. In any case, the Congo's uranium mine was flooded and sealed several decades ago, which means that Iraq would not have been able to obtain uranium there even if it tried."

This intelligence (which had controversially found its way into George W. Bush's 2003 State of the Union speech) had previously (before September 2003) been thought to rely on forged documents. The Butler Review stated that "the forged documents were not available to the British Government at the time its assessment was made." Taking into account the American intelligence community's findings on the matter, it is true that in December 2003, then CIA director George Tenet conceded that the inclusion of the claim in the State of the Union address was a mistake. However, Tenet believed so, not due to any compelling evidence to the contrary, but rather because the CIA (criticized concerning this matter by the Senate Report of Pre-war Intelligence on Iraq) had failed to investigate the claim thoroughly; however again, the Butler Review states that in 2002 the CIA "agreed that there was evidence that [uranium from Africa] had been sought." In the run-up to war in Iraq, the British Intelligence Services apparently believed that Iraq had been trying to obtain uranium from Africa; however, no evidence has been passed on to the IAEA apart from the forged documents.}

The report did not blame any specific individuals. It specifically stated that John Scarlett, the head of the JIC should not resign, and indeed should take up his new post as head of MI6.

== Criticism ==
=== Appointees ===
Private Eye magazine expressed misgivings against members of a committee personally appointed by Prime Minister Tony Blair. The magazine was particularly critical over the choice selection of New Labour Party politician and close acquaintance Ann Taylor, writing "Taylor is hardly a disinterested observer: she was herself involved in the famous 'September dossier' that explained Blair's reasons for going to war."

On 18 September 2002 an official in Blair's office sent this memo to chief of staff Jonathan Powell and Alastair Campbell: "The PM has asked Ann Taylor to read through the dossier in draft and give us any comments. He stressed that it is for her and for her only and that no one else outside this building was seeing it in draft. I'm contacting John Scarlett to work out how this should happen – needs to be tomorrow." Taylor went to Scarlett's office at 8 o'clock the next morning, read the dossier and gave her comments to the spy chief – who then passed them on to Blair. She advised that it "needs to come across as an impartial, professional assessment of the threat", and that the PM should "undercut critics" by explaining why Saddam should be stopped now. So the only person outside No 10 and the JIC who was trusted to help with the dossier (and who also expressed a wish to see Blair's critics undercut) is now sitting on the inquiry into its contents. One wonders why Blair didn't go the whole hog and add Alastair Campbell to Lord Butler's team of independent inquisitors.

Lynne Jones (MP) was also critical of Taylor's involvement in subsequent inquiries, stating: "It is self-evidently bad practice to appoint someone to a committee when their previous conclusions are under scrutiny". A piece in the Western Mail was more direct, noting of a joke that followed the publication of the report: "When you call the Butler, you get what you ordered".

=== Uranium conclusion ===
Nuclear expert Norman Dombey, a professor of Theoretical Physics at the University of Sussex, said the information relied upon by the Butler Review on the Niger issue was incomplete. "The Butler report says the claim was credible because an Iraqi diplomat visited Niger in 1999, and almost three-quarters of Niger's exports were uranium. But this is irrelevant, since France controls Niger's uranium mines". Dombey also noted that Iraq already had some 550 tonnes of uranium compound sitting in its gutted Tuwaitha nuclear research center:

Iraq already had far more uranium than it needed for any conceivable nuclear weapons programme. ... Nuclear weapons are difficult and expensive to build not because uranium is scarce, but because it is difficult and expensive to enrich U235 from 0.7 per cent to the 90 per cent needed for a bomb. Enrichment plants are large, use a lot of electricity and are almost impossible to conceal. Neither British security services nor the CIA seriously thought Iraq had a functioning enrichment plant that would have justified all the noise about nuclear weapons we heard before the war. When I read of the supposed Iraqi purchase of uranium from Niger, I thought it smelt distinctly fishy. ... It was a gigantic red herring.

London's Evening Standard daily newspaper dismissed the report's findings, under the front-page headline "Whitewash (Part Two)", saying Lord Butler had effectively thrown Tony Blair "a lifebelt" by claiming that Saddam was indeed trying to procure uranium from Niger in 1999 to build a nuclear bomb, and concluding that illicit "material may be hidden in the sand".

== See also ==
- Iraq Dossier
- Downing Street memo
- Iraq Inquiry
- September Dossier

== Sources ==
- The full text of the Butler report (from BBC)
- Butler report (from The Guardian)
- May, Clifford D. (12 July 2004). "Our man in Niger". National Review. Archived from the original on 14 July 2004.
- McIntyre, Jamie; Ensor, David (25 December 2003). "Tenet admits error in approving Bush speech". CNN.com.
- "The Niger connection: how a spy story tarnished British and US reputations". The Sunday Times. London: Times Newspapers Ltd. 13 July 2003.
- Schmidt, Susan (10 July 2004). "Plame's input is cited on Niger mission". Washington Post. p. A09.
