= September Dossier =

British government document about Iraq

Iraq's Weapons of Mass Destruction: The Assessment of the British Government, also known as the September Dossier, was a document published by the British government on 24 September 2002. Parliament was recalled on the same day to discuss the contents of the document. The paper was part of an ongoing investigation by the government into weapons of mass destruction (WMD) in Iraq, which ultimately led to the invasion of Iraq six months later. It contained a number of allegations according to which Iraq also possessed WMD, including chemical weapons and biological weapons. The dossier even alleged that Iraq had reconstituted its nuclear weapons programme.

The much-anticipated document was based on reports made by the Joint Intelligence Committee, part of the British Intelligence 'machinery'. Most of the evidence was uncredited, ostensibly to protect sources. On publication, serious press comment was generally critical of the dossier for tameness and for the seeming lack of any genuinely new evidence. Those politically opposed to military action against Iraq generally agreed that the dossier was unremarkable, with Menzies Campbell observing in the House of Commons that:

We can also agree that [Saddam Hussein] most certainly has chemical and biological weapons and is working towards a nuclear capability. The dossier contains confirmation of information that we either knew or most certainly should have been willing to assume.

However, two sections later became the centre of fierce debate: the allegation that Iraq had sought "significant quantities of uranium from Africa", and the claim in the foreword to the document written by British prime minister Tony Blair that "The document discloses that his military planning allows for some of the WMD to be ready within 45 minutes of an order to use them."

Britain's biggest selling popular daily newspaper, The Sun, subsequently carried the headline "Brits 45mins from doom", while the Daily Star reported "Mad Saddam ready to attack: 45 minutes from a chemical war", helping to create the impression among the British public that Iraq was a threat to Britain.

Major General Michael Laurie, one of those involved in producing the dossier wrote to the Chilcot Inquiry in 2011 saying "the purpose of the dossier was precisely to make a case for war, rather than setting out the available intelligence, and that to make the best out of sparse and inconclusive intelligence the wording was developed with care." On 26 June 2011, The Observer reported on a memo from the chair of the JIC in 2003, John Scarlett, to Blair's foreign affairs adviser, released under the Freedom of Information Act, which referred to "the benefit of obscuring the fact that in terms of WMD Iraq is not that exceptional". The memo has been described as one of the most significant documents on the September dossier yet published as it is considered a proposal to mislead the public.

== Claims ==
=== Uranium from Niger ===
The claim that Iraq was seeking to buy uranium from Africa was repeated in US president George W. Bush's January 2003 State of the Union Address. The controversial '16 words' used by President Bush on 28 January 2003 were:

The British government has learned that Saddam Hussein recently sought significant quantities of uranium from Africa.

In March 2003, the International Atomic Energy Agency (IAEA), when it finally obtained the documents referred to by United States Secretary of State Colin Powell to the United Nations Security Council alleging transactions between Niger and Iraq, concluded that they were obvious fakes.

Subsequently, CIA director George Tenet stated that the remarks should not have been included in the US President's speech. This followed a remark by US National Security Advisor Condoleezza Rice, saying that the presence of the line in the speech showed that it had been authorised by the CIA.

In July, Tony Blair testified to the House of Commons Liaison Committee that the evidence the government had regarding Iraq's dealings with Niger came from a separate source to the fraudulent documents. Ever since Powell's presentation, critics argued that had the US and UK intelligence services fully cooperated with United Nations weapons inspectors, it could have been found out whether the claims were truthful.

The same month, British Foreign Secretary Jack Straw told the Foreign Affairs Select Committee (which was investigating the veracity of the claims in the dossier) that the statement in the dossier rested on separate evidence which was still under review, and that this specific intelligence had not been shared with the CIA. In written evidence to the same committee however, Straw further disclosed that the intelligence information upon which the British government had relied was shared separately with the IAEA by a foreign government shortly before their report of 7 March 2003. This was further confirmed in a Parliamentary answer to Lynne Jones MP. Lynne Jones subsequently contacted the IAEA to question whether a third party had discussed or shared separate intelligence with them and, if so, what assessment they made of it. IAEA spokesman Mark Gwozdecky responded to Jones on 25 May 2004:

I can confirm to you that we have received information from a number of member states regarding the allegation that Iraq sought to acquire uranium from Niger. However, we have learned nothing which would cause us to change the conclusion we reported to the United Nations Security Council on March 7, 2003 with regards to the documents assessed to be forgeries and have not received any information that would appear to be based on anything other than those documents.

The Foreign Affairs Select Committee judged that the British government had been wrong to state in an unqualified manner something that had not been established beyond doubt:

We conclude that it is very odd indeed that the Government asserts that it was not relying on the evidence which has since been shown to have been forged, but that eight months later it is still reviewing the other evidence. The assertion "…that Iraq sought the supply of significant amounts of uranium from Africa …" should have been qualified to reflect the uncertainty.

The Butler Review, whose own report was issued after the aforementioned public investigation, concluded that the report Saddam's government was seeking uranium in Africa appeared credible:

a. It is accepted by all parties that Iraqi officials visited Niger in 1999.

b. The British Government had intelligence from several different sources indicating that this visit was for the purpose of acquiring uranium. Since uranium constitutes almost three-quarters of Niger's exports, the intelligence was credible.

c. The evidence was not conclusive that Iraq actually purchased, as opposed to having sought, uranium, and the British Government did not claim this.

d. The forged documents were not available to the British Government at the time its assessment was made, and so the fact of the forgery does not undermine it.

The Butler Review also made a specific conclusion on President Bush's 16 words: "By extension, we conclude also that the statement in President Bush's State of the Union Address of 28 January 2003 that: 'The British Government has learned that Saddam Hussein recently sought significant quantities of uranium from Africa.' was well-founded."

=== The 45 minute claim ===
The 45 minute claim lay at the centre of a dispute between Downing Street and the BBC. On 29 May 2003, BBC defence correspondent Andrew Gilligan filed a report for BBC Radio 4's Today programme in which he stated that an unnamed source – a senior British official – had told him that the September Dossier had been "sexed up", and that the intelligence agencies were concerned about some "dubious" information contained within it – specifically the claim that Saddam Hussein could deploy weapons of mass destruction within 45 minutes of an order to use them.

On 1 June, Gilligan expanded upon that claim in The Mail on Sunday newspaper, stating that the government's director of communications, Alastair Campbell, had been responsible for the insertion of the 45-minute claim, against the wishes of the intelligence agencies. Gilligan subsequently gave evidence before the Foreign Affairs Select Committee, as did Campbell, who denied ordering the inclusion of the claim, and demanded an apology from the BBC. He subsequently backed this demand in writing.

The BBC refused to apologise, and stood by Gilligan's story. Campbell responded angrily, with an appearance on Channel 4 News.

On 7 July, the Select Committee published a report which cleared Campbell, albeit on the casting vote of the chairman. In the report, the committee stated that the 45-minute claim had been given "undue prominence".

On 15 September, MI6 head Richard Dearlove told the Hutton Inquiry that the claim related to battlefield WMD rather than weapons of mass destruction of a larger range than just battlefield. On the same day, Tony Cragg, the retired deputy chief of defence intelligence, admitted there were memos from two members of DIS objecting that parts of the dossier, including the 45-minute claim, was "far too strong" or "over-egged".

On 28 January 2004, the Hutton Inquiry released its report, which among other things concluded that:

- "Mr Gilligan accepted that he had made errors" about the 45 minute claim; specifically, his report that the government "probably knew that the 45 minutes claim was wrong or questionable", and his report that intelligence officers were unhappy with the insertion of the claim in the dossier, or only inserted it at the insistence of the government, were erroneous.
- Hutton was "satisfied that Dr Kelly did not say to Mr Gilligan" certain dramatic statements about the 45 minute claim, which Gilligan had reported as direct quotations.
- That only one person (Dr. Jones) had expressed any reservations about the 45 minute claim, and that was about the strength of the wording, not its inclusion.

Information surfacing in late 2009 initially appeared to suggest that the source of the 45 minute claim was in fact a taxi driver "on the Iraqi-Jordanian border, who had remembered an overheard conversation in the back of his cab a full two years earlier". Whether or not the taxi driver was the source of the 45-minute claim or instead "something about missiles" remains an open question.

It is also claimed by Adam Holloway MP that "When the information was acquired by MI6, a footnote was written on the page of an intelligence report sent to No 10 stating that the claim was 'verifiably inaccurate'."

== Role in the death of David Kelly ==
The following day, 30 May 2003, the Ministry of Defence claimed that one of its officials (later named as Dr. David Kelly) had come forward, admitting to having discussed the matter of Iraq's weapons with Gilligan on 22 May. The BBC responded by saying that Kelly differed from Gilligan's key source in "important ways". Kelly was subsequently called before the Foreign Affairs Select Committee whose conclusion was that Kelly was being used as a scapegoat and that he had not been Gilligan's key mole.

On 17 July, Gilligan gave evidence to a private session of the Select Committee, and was subsequently criticised for not naming his source, and for changing his story. The BBC continued to stand by him.

On the same day, Kelly left his home for an area of woodland and was later found dead with his left wrist slit, apparently having committed suicide.

On 20 July, Richard Sambrook, director of news at the BBC, revealed that Kelly was indeed the key source for Gilligan's report, and that the BBC had not said so before so as to protect Kelly. The BBC stressed that Gilligan's reporting accurately reflected Kelly's comments, implying that Kelly had not been entirely truthful with the Select Committee. An inquest into the cause of the death was begun, but was suspended by Lord Falconer.

The BBC committed to assisting fully with the then forthcoming Hutton Inquiry into Kelly's death.

On 28 January 2004, the Hutton Inquiry published its report. With regard to the death of Kelly:

- Hutton was "satisfied that Kelly took his own life"
- Hutton was "satisfied that Dr. Kelly did not say to Mr Gilligan" certain dramatic statements which Gilligan had reported as quotations. Regarding certain other statements (reported by Gilligan as quotations but also denied by Kelly), it was "not possible to reach a definite conclusion" whether it was Gilligan or Kelly who had lied.
- Kelly's meeting with Gilligan was "in breach of the Civil Service code"
- Kelly may not have originally intended to discuss intelligence matters with Gilligan, but after 29 May he "must have come to realise the gravity of the situation".
- The BBC's investigation into Gilligan's report was flawed, and "the Governors should have recognised more fully than they did that their duty to protect the independence of the BBC was not incompatible with giving proper consideration to whether there was validity in the Government's complaints"
- The Ministry of Defence (MOD) was at fault for not informing Kelly of their strategy that would involve naming him.

Dissatisfied with the results of the Hutton Inquiry, in 2010 experts called for the suspended inquest to be reopened.

== See also ==
- British parliamentary approval for the invasion of Iraq
- Bush–Blair 2003 Iraq memo
- Butler Review of intelligence relating to Iraq war
- Downing Street memo of pre-war meeting between UK ministers
- Iraq Dossier government briefing issued to journalists on 3 February 2003
- Iraq Inquiry
- Iraq Survey Group
- Opinion on legality of war by UK Attorney General
