= Andrew Gilligan =

British political adviser and journalist (born 1968)

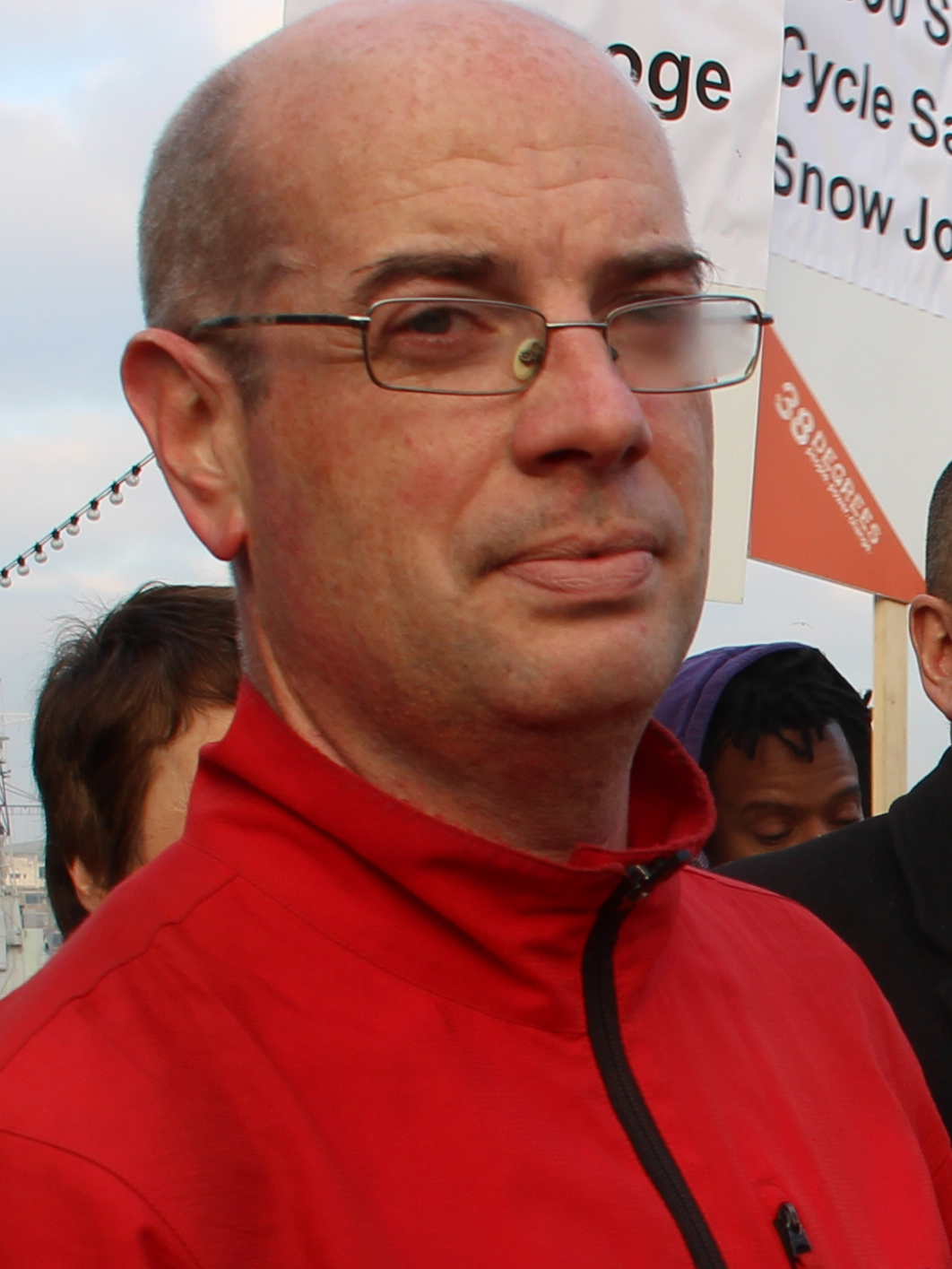
Gilligan beside the River Thames outside London City Hall

Andrew Paul Gilligan (born 22 November 1968) is a British political adviser and former journalist. He served as a special adviser to Prime Minister Rishi Sunak, having previously worked as a transport adviser to Boris Johnson both as Mayor of London and as Prime Minister. He is now senior fellow and head of transport, infrastructure and London at the think-tank Policy Exchange.

Until July 2019, Gilligan was senior correspondent of The Sunday Times and had also served as head of the Capital City Foundation at Policy Exchange. Between 2013 and 2016 he also worked as the Mayor's cycling commissioner for London, and in 2020 he was an appointee of Central Government to TfL's Board. He is best known for a 2003 report on BBC Radio 4's Today programme in which he described a British government briefing paper on Iraq and weapons of mass destruction (the September Dossier) as having been "transformed in the week before it was published to make it sexier". This change became widely known, in the words of newspaper headlines about the story, as being "sexed up". His source for this, Dr. David Kelly, later killed himself.

Gilligan was awarded Journalist of the Year in 2008 for his investigative reports on Ken Livingstone and was shortlisted for the award again in 2015 for investigations which helped cause the downfall of politician Lutfur Rahman. He has also been a nominee for the Paul Foot Award, the Orwell Prize, the British Journalism Awards and Foreign Reporter of the Year at the British Press Awards.

== Early life and education ==
Gilligan was born in Teddington, London, to Catholic parents, Kevin and Ann. Kevin was formerly a Labour Party councillor in Teddington and had graduated from University College London. Andrew was educated at Grey Court School, Kingston College of Further Education and at St John's College, Cambridge, where he studied history and was news editor of the student newspaper Varsity. He was also a member of Cambridge Universities Labour Club.

== Career ==
=== Journalism ===
In 1994, Gilligan joined the Cambridge Evening News, then in 1995 moved to The Sunday Telegraph, where he became a specialist reporter on defence.

In 1999, Gilligan was recruited by the editor of BBC Radio 4's Today programme, Rod Liddle, as Defence and Diplomatic Correspondent. In May 2003, Gilligan made a broadcast in which he claimed that the British Government had "sexed up" a report in order to exaggerate the weapon of mass destruction capabilities of Saddam Hussein. Gilligan resigned from the BBC in 2004, in the wake of the Hutton Inquiry surrounding the death of David Kelly, after Lord Hutton questioned the reliability of Gilligan's evidence.

Gilligan was then offered a job at The Spectator by its editor, Boris Johnson, who had been a key supporter of Gilligan during the Hutton Inquiry. Later that year, Gilligan joined the London Evening Standard. He was named Journalist of the Year at the British Press Awards in 2008 for his work on the London Mayoral elections, described as "relentless investigative journalism at its best".

Between 2007 and 2009, Gilligan presented a fortnightly programme for Press TV, the Iranian government's English-language TV channel. Rod Liddle challenged Gilligan in July 2009 about working for an "international propaganda channel run by the Iranian government". Gilligan stopped his regular show in December 2009, though he appeared twice more on the network just before the UK's May 2010 general election. Gilligan attributed his decision to leave to the politics of Iran "that was inconsistent with my opposition to Islamism. I have not worked for Press TV since."

In 2009, Gilligan became London editor of The Daily Telegraph and The Sunday Telegraph. He was also a reporter for Channel 4's investigative programme Dispatches, covering a number of issues, including Rahman and his claimed involvement with the Islamic Forum of Europe in the London borough of Tower Hamlets. He has also been a cover presenter for LBC radio. On 22 November 2011, Gilligan criticised the Leveson Inquiry in an appearance before the House of Lords communications committee. In August 2016, Gilligan was part of a wave of redundancies at The Daily Telegraph; he joined The Sunday Times immediately afterwards.

=== Political advisory ===
In January 2013, Gilligan was appointed as the Cycling Commissioner for London by the Mayor, Boris Johnson. Accusations of "cronyism" were made following the appointment as Gilligan was considered instrumental in toppling the Mayor's main rival, Ken Livingstone. He helped deliver London's first segregated cycle superhighways and was subsequently given an award by the London Cycling Campaign for his "outstanding contribution to cycling."

In 2019, Gilligan was appointed transport adviser by the then Prime Minister, Boris Johnson, based in the Downing Street policy unit. In July 2020, Grant Shapps, Transport Secretary, appointed Gilligan to TfL's Board as one of two Special Representative attendees.

Gilligan was appointed as a special adviser to Prime Minister Rishi Sunak in March 2023. He was reportedly instrumental in persuading Sunak to abandon the proposed northern leg of the High Speed 2 railway infrastructure project.

In July 2024, Gilligan rejoined Policy Exchange as head of transport, infrastructure and London.

== Legal and regulatory issues ==
In May 2016, The Telegraph apologised and paid substantial damages as part of an out-of-court settlement for defamation due to false claims made by Gilligan in a series of articles alleging corruption surrounding the purchase of Poplar Town Hall by businessman Mujibul Islam from Tower Hamlets Council when Rahman was mayor.

In May 2018, The Sunday Telegraph paid "substantial damages" to settle a defamation case brought against it by Mohammed Kozbar in relation to an article by Gilligan in March 2016. Gilligan had accused Kozbar of supporting Palestinian violence against Israel's occupation. Gilligan tweeted that he stood by what he wrote.

In January 2019, The Sunday Times was required to publish a correction by the Independent Press Standards Organisation, which ruled that an article in July 2018 by Gilligan about laws regarding transgender people had been "misleading".
