= List of witnesses of the Iraq Inquiry =

This is a list of witnesses of the Iraq Inquiry, sorted chronologically, who have given testimony to the Iraq Inquiry, a British public inquiry into the United Kingdom's role in the Iraq War. The inquiry, chaired by career civil servant John Chilcot, commenced on 24 November 2009. From November to December 2009, the witnesses were primarily civil servants and military officials including Tim Cross and Peter Ricketts. Following a Christmas break, the inquiry heard predominantly from politicians, including former cabinet ministers, including Gordon Brown as well as Tony Blair, Prime Minister at the time of the invasion. The Iraq Inquiry adjourned in March 2010 to avoid influencing the general election campaign and the last witnesses gave testimony in June 2011. On 6 July 2016 Sir John Chilcot published the report, more than seven years after the inquiry was announced.

== November 2009 ==
=== 24 November ===
- Sir Peter Ricketts – chairman, Joint Intelligence Committee at the time of the invasion of Iraq.

Ricketts gave evidence regarding the buildup to the Iraq War in which he claimed there was a "palpable" threat that Saddam Hussein could have acquired weapons of mass destruction, though he went on to say that nobody in the British government was advocating Hussein's removal at that point. He also told the inquiry that the British government had been reviewing its policies on Iraq as early as 2001, in anticipation of the Bush administration taking power in the USA.

- Sir William Patey – head of the FCO's Middle East Department in 2003.

Patey offered similar testimony on attitudes towards "regime change", though added that the 11 September attacks "added an edge" to concerns over Iraq's acquisition of weapons of mass destruction

- Simon Webb – civil servant; policy director at the Ministry of Defence in 2003
- Sir Michael Wood – chief legal adviser to the Foreign and Commonwealth Office at the time of the invasion.

Wood would also give evidence in January 2010

=== 25 November ===
- Sir William Ehrman – director general for defence and intelligence at the Foreign and Commonwealth Office.

Ehrman gave evidence that intelligence in 2003 suggested that Iraq may not have weapons of mass destruction and that Tony Blair, prime minister of the day had been aware of the evidence when he presented the "September Dossier" to Parliament. However, Ehrman went on to defend the invasion, claiming that Iraq had "flouted" United Nations resolutions.

- Tim Dowse – Director of Counter-Proliferation at the FCO, 2001–2003.

Dowse testified that most of Iraq's weapons of mass destruction were believed to have been destroyed in the first Gulf War but claimed there was a "unique threat" posed by Iraq indicating by its previous use WMD

=== 26 November ===
- Sir Christopher Meyer – British Ambassador to the United States, 1997–2003.

In the course of his evidence, Meyer spoke about a private meeting between Tony Blair and then US President George W. Bush, stating that the first use of the term "regime change" by Blair followed that meeting. Meyer also criticised the process of weapons inspections conducted prior to the invasion and stated that he believed the decision to go to war in Iraq had been made a full year before the invasion at the meeting at the Bush family ranch

=== 27 November ===
- Sir Jeremy Greenstock – British ambassador to the United Nations, 1997–2003.

Greenstock testified that the invasion of Iraq did not have the backing of the majority of the UK or of United Nations members, going on to opine that the war was of "questionable legitimacy", though it was unlikely ever to be proven illegal. Greenstock also appeared before the inquiry on 15 December

=== 30 November ===
- Sir David Manning – foreign policy advisor to Tony Blair, 2001–2003

Manning testified that Blair had lobbied Bush to pursue a second UN resolution but was "willing to undertake regime change if this didn't work"

== December 2009 ==
=== 1 December ===
- Edward Chaplin – director of Middle East policy, FCO, 2002–2004

Chaplin was highly critical of post-war planning for Iraq, stating that the US State Department had a "touching faith" that its troops would be welcomed in Iraq with an expectation that a democracy would be quickly established, calling reconstruction plans a "real blind spot"

=== 3 December ===
- Admiral Lord Boyce – Chief of the Defence Staff, 2001–2003

Boyce claimed that the United States assumed, in 2002, that the United Kingdom would contribute troops for a conflict in Iraq, saying "there was a complete reluctance to believe" the UK would not commit its forces without further efforts via the United Nations. Boyce also attacked the post-war planning conducted by Clare Short's Department for International Development, calling it "particularly uncooperative"

- Sir Kevin Tebbit – Permanent Under-Secretary to the Ministry of Defence from 1998 to 2005

Tebbit claimed that the UK's planning for an invasion was "cautious" as policy was to pursue further UN involvement and the British government insisted on parliamentary approval before committing troops. He also stated that the UK's commitment to an invasion was not confirmed "until right at the end"

=== 4 December ===
- Major General David Wilson – British adviser to US Army Central Command in 2002

Wilson told the inquiry that British officials were shown the American invasion plans in June 2002 but states he told American officials that, "unless political and legal issues were resolved, [it would be] difficult for the UK to deliver even basic support"

- Lieutenant General Sir Anthony Pigott – Deputy Chief of the Defence Staff (Commitments), 2000–2002.

Wilson said the speed with which troops reached Baghdad "was no surprise [...] but that's not the end of the war". He went on to speak of the benefits a joint invasion would bring to relations between the two militaries

- Dominic Asquith – director for Iraq, 2004–2006; British Ambassador to Iraq, 2006–2007.

Asquith told the inquiry that Her Majesty's Treasury, under then Chancellor of the Exchequer Gordon Brown, refused to allocate extra funds for reconstruction efforts in British-controlled Basra, claiming government departments were told to use existing budgets

=== 7 December ===
- Major General Tim Cross – British representative to the Coalition Provisional Authority and later General Officer Commanding Theatre Troops, Iraq.

Cross, UK representative to the Office for Reconstruction and Humanitarian Assistance (later the CPA) and deputy to Jay Garner at the time of the invasion, told the inquiry that he had urged Tony Blair to delay military action two days before the conflict began, going on to say that planning for post-war Iraq had been "woefully thin" and claiming to have warned that "Iraq could descend into chaos" following invasion and that his concerns were not taken "sufficiently seriously" by the government.

=== 8 December ===
- Sir John Scarlett – chairman, Joint Intelligence Committee, 2001–2004; Chief of the Secret Intelligence Service, 2004–2009.

Scarlett was questioned at length about the "September Dossier" and the infamous claim that Iraq could launch weapons within 45 minutes. Scarlett denied that he had been under pressure to "firm up" the dossier and conceded that the dossier should have been clearer that "the 45-minute claim" referred to conventional weapons, not those of mass destruction, though stated that the dossier had been produced in good faith

- Sir Suma Chakrabarti – permanent secretary, Department for International Development, 2002–2007.

Chakrabarti told the inquiry that civil servants had been banned from communicating with United nations staff in the planning stages of the invasion on order to conceal the military planning, gong on to say that knowledge of Iraq was "rather scanty" due to the absence of diplomatic relations between the UK and Iraq since the first Gulf War

- Air Chief Marshal Sir Brian Burridge – Commander British forces, Iraq in 2003 (then holding the rank of Air Marshal).

Burridge's testimony related predominantly to the build-up to the invasion of Iraq. He claimed to have been told by US Army General Tommy Franks that military action by the United States against Iraq was a matter of "when not if" but that the military campaign was conducted in such a way as to minimise the effect on the country's infrastructure and on civilians

=== 9 December ===
- Lieutenant General Sir Freddie Viggers – Senior British Military Representative, Iraq.

Viggers claimed that "amateurs" were placed in key roles in Iraq, saying "we've got huge experience in this country – we're not using it and we're putting amateurs into really really important positions and people are getting killed as a result of some of these decisions".

- Sir Hilary Synnott – regional co-ordinator for Southern Iraq, Coalition Provisional Authority.

Synott was critical of the Coalition Provisional Authority, the body set up to govern Iraq in the interim, calling its planning "deeply flawed" and going on to say that the decision to shut down the CPA came as a "total surprise" and that "the assumption [...] was that the decision was greatly coloured by the imminence of the mid-term elections. The CPA was not winning, best to hand over responsibility for Iraqis and to cease to be responsible for Iraqi sovereignty"

- Lieutenant General Sir Graeme Lamb – commander of multinational forces in south-eastern Iraq in 2003; later Senior British Military Representative, Iraq.

Lamb compared the CPA to "dancing with a broken doll. It was a lot of effort and your partner wasn't giving you much in return". He said that the foreign forces in the country "held the line" but that the problems that followed "had not been anticipated [and] were not structured or resourced for" and the foreign forces "contained what was unfolding chaos"

=== 10 December ===
- Sir John Sawers – foreign policy adviser to Tony Blair; later Chief of the Secret Intelligence Service.

Sawyers, who visited the United States in January 2001, told the inquiry that American officials were not discussing an invasion of Iraq at that time but that the UK and US concurred that the containment policy against Iraq at the time was "unsustainable"

=== 14 December ===
- Lieutenant General Sir John Kiszely – Senior Military Representative, Iraq 2004–2005.

Kiszely testified that American officials in Iraq refused to admit that they were facing an insurgency, claiming that United States Secretary of Defense Donald Rumsfeld "had instructed that it was not to be called an insurgency". Kiszely told the inquiry that the situation in the country deteriorated after he took up his post as senior military representative. He observed a rise in attacks on coalition and Iraqi security forces, stating that "the rule of law did not really exist in a number of provinces".

- Lieutenant General Jonathon Riley – divisional commander of multinational forces in southern Iraq, 2004–2005.

Riley defended the decision to disband the Iraqi Army after the invasion, saying that it had effectively "disbanded itself". However, he told the inquiry that "[he] had not [...] expected to be faced with an insurgency" and that the forces "did have to go through a process [of] relearning. And we did it on the job". However, Riley went on to say that new troops arriving in the country were ""much better prepared"

=== 15 December ===
- Sir Jeremy Greenstock – British ambassador to the United Nations from 1997 to 2003.

Greenstock, who also appeared before the inquiry on 27 November, told the inquiry that he believed the whole campaign in Iraq had been "rushed" and lacked international input, saying "this was clearly too rushed an exercise for the size of the task we found on the ground; a task which some people had been predicting would be as difficult as it was". During the course of his evidence, Greenstock was interrupted by Sir John Chilcot, the inquiry chairman, and, for the first, the inquiry went into private session and public broadcasting, on a one-minute delay, was suspended

=== 16 December ===
- Sir John Sawers – foreign policy adviser to Tony Blair; later Chief of the Secret Intelligence Service.

Sawers, who also appeared before the inquiry on 10 December, claimed that the British government may have had "second thoughts" if the level of violence after the war and the attraction of Iraq to al-Qaeda and other Islamic extremists had been foreseen, quoting Egyptian President Hosni Mubarak's comment that the war would unleash "100 Bin Ladens", though he concluded that Iraq was a "better place" in 2009 than it was in 2003

=== 17 December ===
- Jim Drummond – Iraq director, Department for International Development, 2003–2005

Drummond's evidence focused predominantly around the bombing of the United Nations headquarters in Baghdad in August 2003 which, he said, had "a very serious impact" on the rebuilding efforts as most UN personnel evacuated Iraq in its aftermath, with Drummond going on to say "I don't think we realised at the time quite how serious it was going to be, because we had envisaged a major role for the UN in this process"

== January 2010 ==
=== 5 January ===
- Sir William Patey – head of the FCO's Middle East Department in 2003; later British Ambassador to Iraq.

Patey, who previously appeared before the inquiry on 24 November, told the inquiry that ambitions for post-war reform and reconstruction of Iraq were "probably higher than the ability to deliver" and recalled writing "the prospect of descent into civil war [...] was probably more likely than the transition to a stable Iraq unless certain things happened" and concluded that "what could be delivered on Powerpoint couldn't necessarily be delivered on Earth. That's something that struck me in my time there"

=== 6 January ===
- General Sir Peter Wall – Commander, 1 (UK) Armoured Division in 2003; later Deputy Chief of the General Staff.

Wall, a division commander in Iraq in 2003/4, spoke to the inquiry about a controversial claim that British troops were "sitting ducks" at Basra palace and of the boredom of young soldiers in the drawdown of the operation when troops moved from Basra Palace to the airport

- Christopher Prentice – British Ambassador to Iraq, 2007–2009.

Prentice offered evidence about relations between the United Kingdom and Iraqi Prime Minister Nouri al-Maliki

- Jon Day – Director General, Operational Policy, Ministry of Defence, 2007–2008; Policy Director, MoD, 2008–2009.

Day gave evidence to the inquiry regarding the negotiation of a ceasefire between British forces and the Mahdi Army militia group

- Simon McDonald – Foreign policy adviser to Gordon Brown.

McDonald gave evidence that the US was concerned at the British plans for early withdrawal from Basra and, as a result, the British government "adjusted our plans in accordance with our discussions with them" and the scale and speed of the withdrawal was altered.

=== 7 January ===
- Lieutenant-General Barney White-Spunner – General Officer Commanding, Multinational Division, South East Iraq, 2008–2009

White-Spunner told the inquiry that he had been asked by Iraqi forces to conduct aerial bombing of areas potentially occupied by civilians but that he refused and the resistance "crumbled quickly" in the face of the resulting ground operation

=== 8 January ===
- Peter Watkins – Ministry of Defence civil servant

Watkins told the inquiry of the complexities of the British withdrawal from Basra in 2009, saying "we should have applied the Balkans principle of in together out together"

=== 11 January ===
- Lieutenant General Richard Shirreff – General Officer Commanding, Multinational Division, South East Iraq July 2006 – January 2007

Shirreff told the inquiry that British forces were not providing security in Basra in 2006, saying that, for a city of 1.3 million people, only 200 troops could be sent out on patrol at one time and that "the [UK's] troops were deployed [...] effectively" while "the militia filled the gap". As a result, Shirreff implemented further training for the Iraqi security forces

=== 12 January ===
- Alastair Campbell – Director of Communications and Strategy for Tony Blair.

Campbell "defend[ed] every single word" of the "September Dossier" on the threat posed by Iraq published in 2002 and arguing that the UK should be "proud" of its role "in changing Iraq from what it was to what it is now becoming". Campbell also revealed that Tony Blair had told then President George W. Bush in private that the UK would support the US in military action against Iraq, prompting calls for the publication of private correspondence between Bush and Blair

=== 13 January ===
- Lord Turnbull – former head of Her Majesty's Civil Service.

Turnbull attacked Alastair Campbell (who appeared before the committee the previous day), calling his comments "very poor" but going on to say of Tony Blair that "my hypothesis is he starts as a regime changer"

=== 15 January ===
- Major General Graham Binns – General Officer Commanding, 1 (UK) Armoured Division, 2007–2008

Binns had the responsibility of formally handing over control of the city of Basra to Iraqi officials. In his evidence to the inquiry, he described a shortage of helicopters and a reliance on those provided by American forces, though described the American helicopters as "magnificent".

- General Sir John Reith – Chief of Joint Operations, 2001–2004.

It emerged on 16 January that Reith had given evidence in private to the inquiry on 15 January, with Reith citing "personal reasons", though a transcript of his evidence was later made available on the inquiry's website with five words blanked on the grounds of "national security". Reith's evidence predominantly focused on defence procurement in which he was critical of the Ministry of Defence, whom he claims were reluctant to commence procurement planning for an invasion of Iraq so as not to alert the public. Reith said that there were no equipment shortages in the end, but some equipment could not be found.

=== 18 January ===
- Jonathan Powell – former chief of staff to Tony Blair.

Powell dismissed the claims made by Sir Christopher Meyer (who appeared before the inquiry on 26 November) that Tony Blair's rhetoric hardened after a private meeting with then President Bush, going on to say "there was not an undertaking in blood to go to war with Iraq. There was no firm decision to go to war"

=== 19 January ===
- Geoff Hoon MP – Secretary of State for Defence, 1999–2005.

Hoon was the first member of Tony Blair's cabinet to give evidence to The Iraq Inquiry. Hoon told the inquiry that the first he heard of the claim that Iraq could launch weapons in 45 minutes was when it was published in the so-called "September Dossier". When he asked for clarification, he was told that it referred to 'battlefield weapons' only, after which Hoon did "not think much more of it". Hoon also stated that British backing for an invasion was not "inevitable" and, in response to criticisms of the MoD's allocation of resources, claimed his department was under-funded

=== 20 January ===
- Sir David Omand – intelligence co-ordinator, Ministry of Defence, 2002–2005.

Omand told the inquiry of the "September Dossier" that it was feared "we would end up with a document that was simply a series of assertions [...] one can see that adding a bit of local colour like that is asking for trouble but we didn't really spot that at the time"

=== 21 January ===
- Jack Straw MP – Foreign Secretary, 2001–2006.

Straw (then Secretary of State for Justice) was the second member of Tony Blair's cabinet and the first serving cabinet minister to give evidence to The Iraq Inquiry, telling the members he acted "on the basis of the best evidence available at the time" but that the "45-minute claim" had "haunted us ever since". He called the decision to go to war in Iraq the "most difficult decision" of his life

=== 25 January ===
- Des Browne MP – Secretary of State for Defence, May 2006 – October 2008.

Browne told the inquiry that, having no military background, he found it "difficult to come to terms" with fatalities he had to deal with as Defence Secretary and that there had been some discontent that he simultaneously held the post of Secretary of State for Scotland

- John Hutton MP – Secretary of State for Defence, October 2008 – June 2009.

Hutton stated that a lack of helicopters had "undoubtedly been a factor" of the British mission in Iraq [...] the military would have liked more helicopters and the politicians would have liked to make more available" but he defended the war overall

=== 26 January ===
- Sir Michael Wood – Chief Legal Adviser, Foreign and Commonwealth Office; 2001–2006.

Wood claimed to have told Jack Straw (then Foreign Secretary) that to invade Iraq without a second Security Council resolution would "amount to the crime of aggression" but that his advice was dismissed as "dogmatic"

- Elizabeth Wilmshurst – Deputy Chief Legal Adviser, Foreign and Commonwealth Office in the run-up to the invasion.

Wilmshurst, the only civil servant to resign in the wake of the decision to invade Iraq told the inquiry that it was "extraordinary" that the Attorney General was asked for his opinion only days before the invasion

=== 27 January ===
- Lord Goldsmith – British Attorney General, 2001–2007.

Goldsmith admitted to the inquiry that, a month before the invasion of Iraq, he believed it was "safer" to obtain a second UN resolution, however, he approved military action based on the wording of the existing resolutions dating back to 1991 but was surprised that the cabinet did not discuss his advice. Justifying his position, Goldsmith said "the military deserved an unequivocal judgement on the legality of its action". Goldsmith also denied reports that he had been "pinned" into altering his advice in a meeting with Lord Falconer of Thoroton, then Lord Chancellor

=== 29 January ===
- Tony Blair – Prime Minister at the time of the invasion.

In the most eagerly anticipated evidence to be given to the Iraq Inquiry, Tony Blair, the prime minister who took the UK to war in Iraq, gave testimony totalling over six hours in length. In particular, Blair emphasised the effect of the 11 September attacks on global security though he denied any "secret deal" was struck in his private meeting with George W. Bush in April 2002. Of the "September Dossier", Blair conceded that he should have corrected media reports that the "45-minute claim" referred to weapons of mass destruction but he "stood by" the claim that Iraq's possession of WMD was "beyond doubt". He also denied being motivated by "regime change", telling the inquiry that he would not have taken the UK into the war had the attorney general advised it was not legally justifiable. Asked by Sir John Chilcot, the inquiry chairman, if he had "any regrets", Blair responded "it was better to deal with this threat, to remove him from office and I do genuinely believe the world is a safer place as a result" to which members of the public gallery heckled Blair, calling him a "liar" and a "murderer" along with booing as he left the inquiry room

== February 2010 ==
=== 1 February ===
- Air Chief Marshal Sir Jock Stirrup – Chief of the Defence Staff, 2006–2010.

Stirrup, the professional head of British armed forces, told the inquiry that commanders "simply didn't have enough time" prior to the invasion to procure all the equipment they required and that an extra two months of preparation would have made a "significant difference". Amongst the equipment Stirrup claimed was lacking were body armour, desert combats and boots. Stirrup went on to say that he and other commanders had voiced their concerns to ministers

- General Lord Walker of Aldringham – Chief of the Defence Staff, 2003–2006.

Walker told the inquiry that the military lacked funding to mount an invasion of Iraq and that the situation was so tense that there was a danger of resignations from senior officers

=== 2 February ===
- Clare Short MP – Secretary of State for International Development, 1997–2003.

Short resigned from the Cabinet in 2003 in protest at the planning for post-war Iraq. She claimed that Lord Goldsmith, then attorney general, had been "leaned on" to declare that the war was legal (denied on Goldsmith's evidence) and the cabinet had been "misled" as to the legality of the invasion and that parliamentary approval had been a "rubber stamp" for Tony Blair. Short went on to tell the inquiry that the war had been conducted "on a wing and a prayer" and to claim that she was "conned" into remaining in her cabinet post until two months after the invasion instead of resigning at the same time as Robin Cook

=== 3 February ===
- Sir Kevin Tebbit – Permanent Under-Secretary, Ministry of Defence, 1998–2005.

Tebbit accused Gordon Brown, then Chancellor of the Exchequer, Gordon Brown of "guillotining" defence spending shortly after the invasion of Iraq and that "I think it's fair to say that the Treasury as a whole didn't want us to get as much as we got"

- John Reid MP – Secretary of State for Defence, 2005–2006.

Reid claimed that the "failures of Vietnam" had haunted the US military during the early days of the campaign in Iraq, telling the panel "the inheritance of that was that American soldiers fought on the battlefield and away from nation-building" and that the UK was likely to remain in Iraq for longer than had been hoped, maintaining "pinch points" such as helicopter support, specialist intelligence and medical provision

- Ann Clwyd MP – Special Envoy to Iraq for Human Rights.

Clwyd told the inquiry that she had been convinced of the need for military action in Iraq and that Kurds believed that it was the only way to uphold their human rights

=== 8 February ===
- General Sir John McColl – deputy commander and senior British representative in the Multinational Force Iraq.
- Jack Straw MP – former Secretary of State for Foreign and Commonwealth Affairs.

Straw was recalled (having previously given evidence on 21 January) to the inquiry in the light of evidence given by foreign office lawyers Sir Michael Wood and Elizabeth Wilmshurst. Straw claimed that there was no need for the cabinet to hear how the then attorney general, Lord Goldsmith, reached his conclusions on the legality of the invasion and that the cabinet needed "essentially a yes or no decision"

== March 2010 ==
=== 5 March ===
- Gordon Brown MP – Chancellor of the Exchequer 1997–2007, Prime Minister 2007–2010
- Douglas Alexander MP – Secretary of State for International Development 2007–2010

== June 2010 ==
=== 29 June ===
- Douglas Brand Chief police adviser to the Iraqi Interior Ministry 2003–2005
- Sir John Holmes – United Kingdom's Ambassador to France, 2001–2007

=== 30 June ===
- Lord Jay of Ewelme – Permanent Under Secretary, Foreign and Commonwealth Office, 2002–2006
- Ian MacLeod – Legal Counsellor to the United Kingdom's Mission to the United Nations, 2001–2004
- Cathy Adams – Legal Counsellor, Legal Secretariat to the Law Officers, 2002–2005

== July 2010 ==
=== 2 July ===
- Bruce Mann – Director General Financial Management, Ministry of Defence, 2001–2004
- Tom McKane – Director General Resource & Plans, Ministry of Defence, 2002–2006
- Trevor Woolley – Director General Resource & Plans, Ministry of Defence, 1998–2002 and Financial Director, Ministry of Defence, 2003–2009

=== 5 July ===
- Sally Keeble – Parliamentary Under Secretary of State for International Development, 2002–2003

=== 6 July ===
- Andy Bearpack – Director Operations and Infrastructure in the Coalition Provisional Authority, 2003–2004
- Martin Howard – Director General Operational Policy, Ministry of Defence, 2004–2007
- Bob Ainsworth MP – Minister of State for the Armed Forces, 2007–2009 and Secretary of State for Defence, 2009

=== 7 July ===
- Richard Dalton – United Kingdom's Ambassador to Iran, 2003–2006
- Geoffrey Adams – United Kingdom's Ambassador to Iran, 2006–2009

=== 9 July ===
- Jonathan Cunliffe – Managing Director, Financial Regulation & Industry, 2002 and managing director, Macroeconomic Policy and International Finance, HM Treasury, 2002–2007
- Mark Etherington – Head of Provincial Reconstruction Team, Basra, 2006–2007

=== 16 July ===
- Michael Wareing – Prime Minister's Envoy for Reconstruction in Southern Iraq and Chairman of the Basra Development Commission, 2007–2009
- Adam Ingram – Minister of State for the Armed Forces, 2001–2007

=== 19 July ===
- Mark Mans – Deputy Adjutant General, 2005–2008
- David Pocock – Deputy Chief of Defence Staff (Personnel), 2005–2007
- Peter Wilkinson – Deputy Chief of Defence Staff (Personnel), 2007–2010

=== 20 July ===
- Eliza Manningham-Buller – Deputy Director General, Security Service (MI5) until 2002 then Director General, Security Service, 2002–2007
- Andy Salmon – General Officer Commanding Multi National Division (South East), 2008 to 2009
- Louis Lillywhite – Surgeon-General, 2006–2009

=== 21 July ===
- Stephen White – Director of Law and Order and Senior Police Adviser to the Coalition Provisional Authority, 2003 to 2004
- Colin Smith – Senior Police Adviser, Basra, 2005–2006
- Anthony Palmer – Deputy Chief of Defence Staff (Personnel), 2002–2005
- Alistair Irwin – Adjutant General, 2003–2005
- Carolyn Miller – Director Europe, Middle East and Americas, Department for International Development, 2001–2004

=== 23 July ===
- Paul Kernaghan – International Policing portfolio lead, Association of Chief Police Officers for England, Wales & Northern Ireland, 2001–2008

=== 26 July ===
- Ronnie Flanagan – HM Chief Inspector of Constabulary, 2005–2008
- Peter Spencer – Chief of Defence Procurement, 2003–2007

=== 27 July ===
- Robert Fulton – Deputy Chief of Defence Staff (Equipment Capability), 2003–2006
- Andrew Figgures – Deputy Chief of Defence Staff (Equipment Capability), 2006–2009
- Hans Blix – 1st Executive Chairman of the United Nations Monitoring, Verification and Inspection Commission, 2000–2003

=== 30 July ===
- John Prescott – Deputy Prime Minister of the United Kingdom, 1997–2007

== January 2011 ==
=== 18 January ===
- Air Chief Marshal Glenn Torpy – United Kingdom's Air Component Commander for Operation Telic One, 2003, and Chief of Joint Operations, 2004–2006, subsequently Chief of the Air Staff, 2006–2009

=== 19 January ===
- Tom McKane – Deputy Head of Defence & Overseas Secretariat, Cabinet Office, 1999–2002
- Stephen Wall – Prime Minister's Adviser on European Issues and Head of the Cabinet Office's European Secretariat, 2000–2004

=== 21 January ===
- Tony Blair – Prime Minister of the United Kingdom, 1997–2007

=== 25 January ===
- Lord Turnbull – Cabinet Secretary and Head of the Home Civil Service, 2002–2005
- Lord Wilson of Dinton – Permanent Under-Secretary of State for the Home Department, 1998–2002

=== 26 January ===
- David Richmond – Deputy United Kingdom Special Representative to Iraq, 2003–2004, United Kingdom Special Representative to Iraq, 2004, Director General Defence and Intelligence, Foreign and Commonwealth Office, 2004–2007

=== 27 January ===
- Lord Boyce – Chief of the Defence Staff, 2001–2003

=== 28 January ===
- Gus O'Donnell – Cabinet Secretary, 2005–2011

=== 31 January ===
- Stephen Pattison – Head of United Nations Department, Foreign and Commonwealth Office, 2001–2003
- John Buck – Director for Iraq, Foreign and Commonwealth Office, 2003–2004

== February 2011 ==
=== 2 February ===
- Jack Straw MP – Secretary of State for Foreign and Commonwealth Affairs, 2001–2006
