= Elizabeth Wilmshurst =

British civil servant

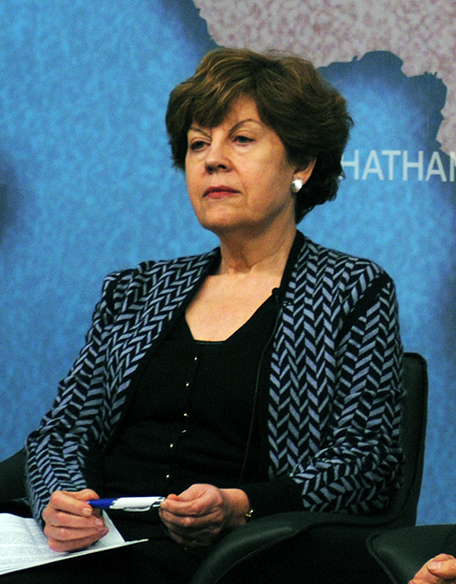

Personal details
- Born: Elizabeth Susan Wilmshurst; 28 August 1948 (age 77)
- Education: King's College London (LLB, AKC)

Elizabeth Susan Wilmshurst CMG KC (born 28 August 1948), Distinguished Fellow of the International Law Programme at Chatham House (the Royal Institute of International Affairs), and Professor of International Law at University College London, is best known for her role as Deputy Legal Adviser at the Foreign and Commonwealth Office of the United Kingdom on the eve of the 2003 invasion of Iraq.

She resigned from the Foreign Office on 20 March 2003, three days after Lord Goldsmith's final advice to the British government reversed her legal opinion (in Lord Goldsmith's first secret memo 10 days earlier) that the invasion was illegal without a second United Nations Security Council Resolution to SCR 678. Although her resignation was public at the time, the detailed reasons and resignation letter were not, and caused a stir when they were released two years later.

On 26 January 2010, Wilmshurst gave evidence to the Iraq Inquiry about the legality of the 2003 invasion of Iraq and the advice given to then Foreign Secretary Jack Straw on the same day as her former boss, Sir Michael Wood.

== Life and career ==
Wilmshurst was educated at Clarendon School for Girls, a private boarding school, and studied law at King's College London (LLB and AKC, 1969).

Wilmshurst was admitted as a solicitor in 1972. From 1974 until her resignation in 2003, she was a legal advisor with HM Diplomatic Service. She was the leading British negotiator of the Rome Statute of the International Criminal Court, both within the framework of the UN Preparatory Committee for the Establishment of an ICC (1996–1998) and the Rome Diplomatic Conference (June–July 1998). She was made a Companion of St Michael and St George (CMG) in 1998. Her writings and publications in the complex area of International Criminal Law include the widely used An Introduction to International Criminal Law and Procedure, co-edited with Robert Cryer, Hakan Friman and Darryl Robinson. She was appointed Honorary Queen's Counsel (QC Honoris Causa) in 2022.

== In popular culture ==
Juliet Stevenson played Wilmshurst in "A Simple Private Matter", an episode of the BBC series 10 Days to War. She is also played by Tamsin Greig in the film Official Secrets about Katharine Gun's leaking of the GCHQ memo.

== Publications ==
- Daragh Murray (editor), Wilmshurst et al. (consultant editors), Practitioners' Guide to Human Rights Law in Armed Conflict. (2016, Oxford University Press).
- Introductory note on the General Assembly resolution 3314 (XXIX) of 14 December 1974 (Definition of Aggression) in the Historic Archives of the United Nations Audiovisual Library of International Law

== See also ==
- Legality of the Iraq War
- Political preparations for 2003 invasion of Iraq
- Clare Short M.P.
- Robin Cook M.P.
- Katharine Gun
- David Kelly
