= Martin Gilbert =

British historian (1936–2015)

The Right Honourable Sir Martin Gilbert CBE FRSL
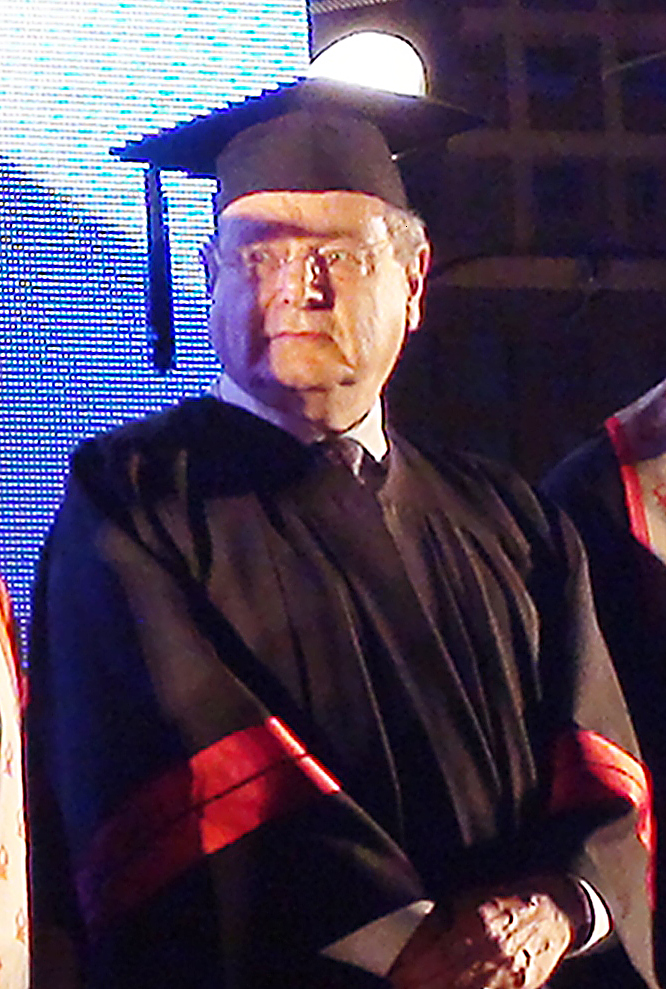
- Gilbert being awarded an honorary doctorate at Ben-Gurion University of the Negev in Beersheba, Israel, 2011
- Born: Martin John Gilbert; 25 October 1936; London, United Kingdom
- Died: 3 February 2015 (aged 78); London, United Kingdom
- Education: Highgate School; Magdalen College, Oxford; St Antony's College, Oxford
- Occupations: Historian; author
- Known for: Winston Churchill's official biography Twentieth century history Jewish history

Sir Martin John Gilbert CBE FRSL (25 October 1936 – 3 February 2015) was a British historian and honorary Fellow of Merton College, Oxford. He was the author of 88 books, including works on Winston Churchill, the 20th century, and Jewish history including the Holocaust. He was a member of the Chilcot Inquiry into Britain's role in the Iraq War.

== Early life and education ==
Martin Gilbert was born in London, the first child of Peter Gilbert, a north London jeweller, and his wife, Miriam. The original family name was Goldberg. All four of his grandparents were Jewish and had been born in the Pale of Settlement in the Russian Empire. Nine months after the outbreak of the Second World War, he was evacuated to Canada as part of the British efforts to safeguard children. Vivid memories of the transatlantic crossing from Liverpool to Quebec sparked his curiosity about the war in later years.

After the war, Gilbert attended Highgate School, where he was taught history by the Balkan expert Alan Palmer, and politics by T. N. Fox. He described himself as being interested in "Jewish things" from a young age, noting that at school he "once or twice got in trouble for my Zionistic activities." He then completed two years of National Service in the Intelligence Corps before going on to study at Magdalen College at the University of Oxford. Gilbert graduated in 1960 with a Bachelor of Arts degree with first-class honours in modern history. One of his tutors at Oxford was A. J. P. Taylor. After his graduation, Gilbert undertook postgraduate research at St Antony's College, Oxford.

== Career ==
=== Historian and author ===
After two years of postgraduate work, Gilbert was approached by Randolph Churchill to assist his work on a biography of his father, Sir Winston Churchill. That same year, 1962, Gilbert was made a Fellow of Merton College, Oxford, and became a part of a circle of academics that included C.S. Lewis and J.R.R. Tolkien. He spent the next few years combining his own research projects in Oxford with being part of Randolph's research team in Suffolk, who were working on the first two volumes of the Churchill biography. When Randolph died in 1968, Gilbert was commissioned to take over the task, completing the remaining six main volumes of the biography.

Gilbert spent the next 20 years on the Churchill project, publishing a number of other books throughout the time. Each main volume of the biography is accompanied by two or three volumes of documents initially called Companions, and so the biography currently runs to 28 volumes (over 30,000 pages), with another 3 document volumes still planned. Michael Foot, reviewing a volume of Gilbert's biography of Churchill in the New Statesman in 1971, praised his meticulous scholarship and wrote: "Whoever made the decision to make Martin Gilbert Churchill's biographer deserves a vote of thanks from the nation. Nothing less would suffice."

In the 1960s, Gilbert compiled a number of historical atlases. His other major works include a single-volume history on the Holocaust, as well as the single-volume histories First World War and Second World War. He also wrote a three-volume series called A History of the Twentieth Century. Gilbert described himself as an "archival historian" who made extensive use of primary sources in his work. Interviewed by the BBC on the subject of Holocaust research in 2005, Gilbert said he believed that the "tireless gathering of facts will ultimately consign Holocaust deniers to history."

By the 1980s Gilbert's academic attention had also turned towards the Refusenik movement in the Soviet Union. Gilbert authored Jews of Hope: The Plight of Soviet Jewry Today (1984) and Shcharansky: Hero of Our Time (1986), and he presented on behalf of the Soviet Jewry Movement in a variety of contexts, ranging from large forums such as formal representation before the United Nations Commission on Human Rights to smaller forums such as an educational slideshow for the general public on behalf of the Soviet Jewry Information Centre.

In 1995, Gilbert retired as a Fellow of Merton College but was made an Honorary Fellow. In 1999 he was awarded a Doctor of Letters degree by the University of Oxford "for the totality of his published work". In 2000 he received the Guardian of Zion Award from the Ingeborg Rennert Center for Jerusalem Studies at Bar-Ilan University. From 2002, he was a Distinguished Fellow of Hillsdale College, Michigan, and between 2006 and 2007 he was a Professor in the History department at the University of Western Ontario. In October 2008, he was elected to an Honorary Fellowship at Churchill College.

Gilbert was noted for his endorsement of Bat Ye'or and her Eurabia theory, providing a cover comment for her 2005 book, and has stated that the theory "is 100 percent accurate". One of Gilbert's last books, In Ishmael's House: A History of the Jews in Muslim Lands cited Ye'or with approval several times.

=== Public service ===
Gilbert was appointed in June 2009 as a member of the British government's inquiry into the Iraq War (headed by Sir John Chilcot). His appointment to this inquiry was criticised in parliament by William Hague, Clare Short, and George Galloway on the basis of scepticism over his neutrality, Gilbert having written in 2004 that George W. Bush and Tony Blair may in the future be esteemed to the same degree as Churchill and Franklin D. Roosevelt. In an article for The Independent on Sunday published in November 2009, Oliver Miles, the former British ambassador to Libya, objected to the presence of Gilbert and Sir Lawrence Freedman on the committee partly because of their Jewish background and Gilbert's Zionist sympathies. In a later interview, Gilbert saw Miles's attack as being motivated by antisemitism.

== Reception ==
Many laud Gilbert's books and atlases for their meticulous scholarship and his clear and objective presentation of complex events. His book on World War I was described as a majestic, single-volume work incorporating all major fronts—domestic, diplomatic, military—for "a stunning achievement of research and storytelling." Catholic sources describe him as a "fair-minded, conscientious collector of facts."

Gilbert's portrayal of Churchill's supportive attitudes to Jews (in his book Churchill and the Jews) has been criticised, for example, by Piers Brendon and Michael J. Cohen. Furthermore, Tom Segev writes that although Gilbert's book The Story of Israel is written with "encyclopaedic clarity," it suffers from the absence of figures from Arab sources.

== Honours and awards ==
In 1990, Gilbert was made a Commander of the Order of the British Empire (CBE). In 1995, he was awarded a knighthood "for services to British history and international relations". In 2003 Gilbert was awarded the Dr. Leopold Lucas Prize by the University of Tübingen. In 2012, he won the Dan David Prize for his contribution to "History/Biography". The Sir Martin Gilbert Library at Highgate School, where he was a pupil, was opened on 6 May 2014 by former Prime Minister Gordon Brown. "I know he helped Lady Thatcher, John Major and Tony Blair, but he also helped me a great deal with his insights into history", said Brown. "I know he advised Harold Wilson even before them, but at every point Martin was available and he wanted to believe that the best outcomes were possible. A genuine humanitarian, someone whose writing of history taught him we could always do better in the future if we are able to learn the lessons of history."

== Honorary degrees ==
Gilbert received honorary degrees from several universities. These include:

Location	Date	School	Degree
Missouri	1981	Westminster College	Doctor of Letters (D.Litt.)
Israel	1989	Bar-Ilan University	Doctorate
Ohio	1992	Hebrew Union College	Doctorate
England	1992	University of Buckingham	Doctor of Letters (D.Litt.)
England	1999	University of Oxford	Doctor of Letters (D.Litt.)
District of Columbia	2000	George Washington University	Doctor of Letters (D.Litt.)
Pennsylvania	2000	Gratz College	Doctorate
New Jersey	2002	Seton Hall University	Doctorate
Ontario	4 June 2003	University of Western Ontario	Doctor of Laws (LL.D)
England	2004	University of Leicester	Doctor of Letters (D.Litt.)
Israel	2004	Hebrew University of Jerusalem	Doctor of Philosophy (PhD)
Israel	2011	Ben-Gurion University of the Negev	Doctorate

== Fellowships ==
Gilbert was a Fellow of the following institutions:

Location	Date	Institution	Appointment
United Kingdom	1977	Royal Society of Literature	Fellowship (FRSL)
England	1994	Merton College, Oxford	Honorary Fellowship
Wales	1997	University of Wales, Lampeter	Honorary Fellowship
California	2002	University of California, San Diego	Distinguished Visiting Fellow
Michigan	2002	Hillsdale College	Distinguished Fellow
England	2008	Churchill College, Cambridge	Honorary Fellowship

== Personal life ==
Gilbert was the target of a serious attempt by the State Protection Authority of Hungary to recruit him as an agent in the early 1960s. He initially responded warmly, and agreed to go on a Hungarian government-funded trip to Budapest in September 1961, and expressed views about Britain which seemed designed to impress his Hungarian hosts (mixed with some untruths about his background). The Hungarians attempted to intercept the many letters he sent back home during the trip, and were able to work out that Gilbert was lying about being a Communist. When invited to a further meeting in Paris, Gilbert did not show up and eventually when his intended handler defected to the West, the Hungarians gave up. Gilbert never explained the incident himself. Writing about it in 2015, Hungarian historian Krisztián Ungváry noted that Gilbert must have realised what was going on, and may have been used by the British intelligence services to plant a double agent.

In 1963, he married Helen Constance Robinson, with whom he had a daughter. He had two sons with his second wife, Susan Sacher, whom he married in 1974. From 2005, he was married to the Holocaust historian Esther Gilbert, née Goldberg. Gilbert described himself as a proud practising Jew and a Zionist.

== Death ==
In March 2012, while on a trip to Jerusalem, Gilbert developed a heart arrhythmia from which he never recovered. He died in London on 3 February 2015, aged 78. Gilbert asked to be buried in Israel. A memorial tribute attended by Gordon Brown and Randolph Churchill (that is, Randolph Leonard Spencer-Churchill, the great-grandson of Winston Churchill) was organised on 24 November 2015 in the Western Marble Arch Synagogue, London.

Gilbert's death was announced on 4 February 2015 by Sir John Chilcot. Giving evidence before the Foreign Affairs Select Committee about delays in the publication of the report of the Iraq Inquiry, Chilcot reported that Gilbert had died the previous night following a long illness.

== Books ==
=== Biography of Winston Churchill ===
Volumes one and two were written by Churchill's son Randolph Churchill, who also edited the two companions to volume one. Gilbert's first work as official biographer was to supervise the posthumous publication of the three companions to volume two, but these were published in Randolph Churchill's name, and indeed, Randolph had already compiled most of the material in his lifetime. In 2008, Gilbert announced that the job of publishing the remaining companion volumes had been taken over by the Hillsdale Press, and the first of these appeared in 2014. The Hillsdale Press had already reprinted the complete biography in eight volumes and the sixteen published companion volumes, as a series titled "The Churchill Documents", so that the volume of 2014 became the seventeenth instalment of this series. Gilbert was incapacitated shortly after its publication, so that subsequent volumes were posthumously published by Gilbert's former research assistant Larry Arnn, with Gilbert credited as co-author.

- Gilbert, Martin (1971a), Winston S Churchill, vol. Three: The Challenge of War: 1914–1916
- —— (1975), Winston S Churchill, vol. Four: The Stricken World 1917–1922
- —— (1979a), Winston S Churchill, vol. Five: Prophet of Truth 1922–1939
- —— (1983), Winston S Churchill, vol. Six: Finest Hour 1939–1941
- —— (1986a), Winston S Churchill, vol. Seven: Road to Victory 1941–1945
- —— (1988), Winston S Churchill, vol. Eight: Never Despair 1945–1965

==== Companion volumes ====
- Gilbert, Martin (1972a), Winston S Churchill, vol. Three, Documents (in two volumes)
- —— (1977a), Winston S Churchill, vol. Four, Documents (in three volumes)
- —— (1979b), Winston S Churchill, vol. The Exchequer Years, 1922–1929, Documents
- —— (1981a), Winston S Churchill, vol. The Wilderness Years, 1929–1935, Documents
- —— (1982a), Winston S Churchill, vol. The Coming of War, 1936–1939, Documents
- —— (1993a), The Churchill War Papers, vol. One: Winston S Churchill, 'At The Admiralty': September 1939 – May 1940
- —— (1995a), The Churchill War Papers, vol. Two: Winston S Churchill, 'Never Surrender': May – December 1940
- —— (2000a), The Churchill War Papers, vol. Three: Winston S Churchill, 'The Ever-Widening War': 1941
- —— (2014), The Churchill Documents, vol. Seventeen: Testing Times: 1942
- ——; Arnn, Larry (2015), The Churchill Documents, vol. Eighteen: One Continent Redeemed, January–August 1943
- ——; Arnn, Larry (2017), The Churchill Documents, vol. Nineteen: Fateful Questions, September 1943 – April 1944
- ——; Arnn, Larry (2018), The Churchill Documents, vol. Twenty: Normandy and Beyond, May–December 1944
- ——; Arnn, Larry (2019), The Churchill Documents, vol. Twenty-One: The Shadows of Victory, January–July 1945
- ——; Arnn, Larry (2019), The Churchill Documents, vol. Twenty-Two: Leader of the Opposition, August 1945–October 1951
- ——; Arnn, Larry (2019), The Churchill Documents, vol. Twenty-Three: Never Flinch, Never Weary, November 1951-February 1965

=== Other books on Winston Churchill ===
- Gilbert, Martin (1966a), Winston Churchill, a short biography for use in schools
- —— (1967), Churchill: Great Lives Observed
- —— (1974a), Churchill: A Photographic Portrait
- —— (1979c), Churchill: An Illustrated Biography
- —— (1981b), Churchill's Political Philosophy
- —— (1981c), Winston Churchill: The Wilderness Years
- —— (1991), Churchill, A Life
- —— (1994), In Search of Churchill
- ——, ed. (1997), Winston Churchill and Emery Reves, Correspondence 1937–1964
- —— (2003a), Churchill at War: His 'Finest Hour' in Photographs, 1940–1945
- —— (2004a), Continue to Pester, Nag and Bite, retitled Winston Churchill's War Leadership
- —— (2005), Churchill and America
- —— (2006a), Will of the People
- —— (2007), Churchill and the Jews
- —— (2012), Churchill: The Power of Words

=== Other biographies and history books ===
- ——; Gott, Richard (1963), The Appeasers
- ——, ed. (1964), Britain and Germany Between the Wars
- —— (1965a), The European Powers 1900–1945
- ——, ed. (1965b), Plough My Own Furrow: The Life of Lord Allen of Hurtwood
- —— (1965c), Recent History Atlas, 1860–1960
- —— (1966b), The Roots of Appeasement
- ——, ed. (1966c), Servant of India, A Study of Imperial Rule in India from 1905 to 1910 as told through the correspondence and diaries of Sir James Dunlop-Smith, Private Secretary to the Viceroy of India
- ——, ed. (1968a), Lloyd George: Great Lives Observed
- —— (1968b), British History Atlas
- —— (1968c), American History Atlas
- —— (1969), Jewish History Atlas
- —— (1970), The Second World War, for use in schools
- —— (1971b), "First World War Atlas", The Geographical Journal, 137 (4): 589, Bibcode:1971GeogJ.137..589M, doi:10.2307/1797186, JSTOR 1797186
- —— (1972b), Russian History Atlas
- —— (1973), Sir Horace Rumbold: Portrait of a Diplomat, 1869–1941
- —— (1974b), The Arab-Israeli Conflict: Its History in Maps
- —— (1976a), The Jews of Arab Lands: Their History in Maps
- —— (1976b), The Jews of Russia: Their History in Maps and Photographs
- —— (1977b), Jerusalem Illustrated History Atlas
- —— (1978a), Exile and Return: The Emergence of Jewish Statehood
- —— (1978b), The Holocaust, Maps and Photographs, for use in schools
- —— (1979d), Final Journey: The Fate of the Jews of Nazi Europe
- —— (1979e), Children's Illustrated Bible Atlas
- —— (1981d), Auschwitz and the Allies
- —— (1982b), Atlas of the Holocaust
- —— (1984), Jews of Hope, The Plight of Soviet Jewry Today
- —— (1985), Jerusalem: Rebirth of a City
- —— (1986b), The Holocaust: The Jewish Tragedy
- —— (1986c), Shcharansky: Hero of Our Time
- —— (1989), Second World War
- —— (1993b), Atlas of British Charities
- —— (1994), First World War
- —— (1995b), The Day the War Ended: May 8, 1945
- —— (1996a), Jerusalem in the Twentieth Century
- —— (1996b), The Boys, Triumph Over Adversity
- —— (1997b), A History of the Twentieth Century, vol. One: 1900–1933
- —— (1997c), Holocaust Journey: Travelling in Search of the Past
- —— (1998), Israel: A History, Doubleday, ISBN 978-0-385-40401-3
- —— (1999a), A History of the Twentieth Century, vol. Two, 1933–1951. Descent into Barbarism
- —— (1999b), A History of the Twentieth Century, vol. Three, 1952–1999. Challenge to Civilisation
- —— (2000b), Never Again: A History of the Holocaust
- —— (2001a), From The Ends of the Earth: The Jews in the Twentieth Century
- —— (2001b), History of the Twentieth Century, condensed version of his three volume history
- —— (2002a), Letters to Auntie Fori: The 5,000-Year History of the Jewish People and their Faith
- —— (2002b), The Righteous: The Unsung Heroes of the Holocaust
- —— (2003b), Geistliche als Retter – auch eine Lehre aus dem Holocaust [The Christian Clergy as Rescuers: A Holocaust Imperative] (in German), Tübingen: Mohr Siebeck, ISBN 978-3-16-148229-8, archived from the original on 24 June 2013
- —— (2004b), D-Day
- —— (2006b), Kristallnacht: Prelude to Destruction
- —— (2006c), The Somme: Heroism and Horror in the First World War
- —— (2008a), The Story of Israel
- —— (2008b), Israel: A History (Revised ed.), Harper Perennial
- —— (2009), Atlas of the Second World War
- —— (2010), In Ishmael's House: A History of the Jews in Muslim Lands, New Haven, CT: Yale University Press, ISBN 978-0-300-16715-3

== See also ==
- Fori Nehru
