= Oliver Miles =

British diplomat (1936–2019)

Richard Oliver Miles CMG (6 March 1936 – 10 November 2019) was a British Ambassador and former chairman of the international business development company MEC International.

== Background and early life ==
Oliver Miles was educated at Ampleforth College and Merton College, Oxford, where he read Classical Mods and Oriental Studies (Arabic and Turkish).

Miles did national service in the Royal Navy and studied Russian. In 1960, he studied Arabic at the Middle East Centre for Arabic Studies in Lebanon.

As a fluent Russian speaker, during his time at Oxford he was invited to accompany a party of students on a trip to the Soviet Union. Miles and Oxford professor Ron Hingley used the pretext of religious observance to slip away from the group to meet dissident author Boris Pasternak, who was being closely watched by the KGB. Miles wrote about the meeting in a letter to the London Review of Books in 2014, describing "Pasternak sitting at one of those upper windows with his eye on the garden gate, where a large shiny black car would occasionally stop for a minute or two and then move slowly on." As they left, Miles recalled, Pasternak said: "When you get home you will wonder how much you should publish of what I have said to you. I have only one request: publish everything."

However, his Russian fluency also attracted the attention of KGB spy George Blake, who approached Miles while he was studying at Oxford, claiming to be an official from Britain's Ministry of Defence. Using a false name, George Askey, Blake asked Miles to help keep an eye on Russian students at Oxford. Miles refused, and was not aware of the false name until he met Blake again in Lebanon, where Blake introduced himself as Blake and asked Miles to forget all about their earlier meeting. Shortly afterwards, Blake was arrested.

Miles married Julia Lyndall Weiner, a social worker and sister of Edmund Weiner (deputy Chief Editor of the Oxford English Dictionary) in 1968. They had four children: three sons (1972, 1973 and 1977) – including the journalist and author Hugh Miles – and one daughter (1979). Oliver had eleven grandchildren; the eldest was born in 2006 and the youngest in 2018.

== Diplomatic career ==
Oliver Miles joined the Foreign & Commonwealth Office in 1960, serving overseas, mainly in the Middle East. In 1964, he was posted as Second Secretary to Amman, and as First Secretary to Makulla in 1966. Miles was appointed Private Secretary to the British High Commissioner in Aden in 1967. In 1970, he was posted to Nicosia and returned to London after three years. He was appointed Counsellor at Jeddah in 1975, and moved to Athens in 1977. He became Head of the FCO's Near East and North African Department in 1980. He was appointed HM Ambassador to Libya in 1984, where he broke off diplomatic relations after the murder of WPC Yvonne Fletcher outside the Libyan embassy in London. Later in 1984, Miles moved to the UK Mission to the United Nations, New York and, from 1985 to 1988, he was Ambassador to Luxembourg.

After two years' secondment at the Northern Ireland Office in Belfast he became the first Director-General of the Joint Directorate for Overseas Trade Services, a new unit set up to improve British Government services to exporters, and travelled widely both in Britain and abroad. At the same time he was a non-executive Director of Vickers Defence Systems.

From 1993 to 1996 Miles was Ambassador to Greece.

Although a great lover of Russian language and literature, and a fluent speaker, Miles was never posted to Moscow, due at least in part to his earlier acquaintance with Blake. "I said rather feebly when I was given this bad news from the Security Department (of the UK Foreign Office), 'Look, if there is one person in the world who knows that I am not a spy, it is George Blake.'"

Miles was appointed Companion of St Michael and St George (CMG) in the 1984 New Year Honours.

== Retirement ==
After retiring from HM Diplomatic Service in 1996 Miles joined MEC International, a consultancy promoting business with the Middle East, and became chairman a decade later. He was for some years president of the Society for Libyan Studies, a learned society under the aegis of the British Academy, and chairman of HOST, a charity which arranges visits to British homes for foreign students in Britain.

He also travelled to Eastern Europe and the former Soviet Union as an OSCE election observer, and enjoyed visiting many places he had always wanted to see. His travels included a cruise down the Volga River in Russia and a trip to the Solovetsky Islands in the White Sea.

From 2004 to 2019 he was Deputy Chairman of the Libyan British Business Council, set up with the approval of the British and Libyan Governments to promote trade and investment.

== Controversy ==
In April 2004, Miles initiated a controversial letter to Prime Minister Tony Blair, signed by 52 retired ambassadors and calling for a new approach to policy in Palestine and Iraq.

Subsequently, he wrote a long series of articles that were published in The Guardian. An article in August 2008, entitled "The long road to normalisation", asked rhetorically whether the recently signed compensation agreement between the United States and Libya would work. The article concluded:

The most important compensation issue, Lockerbie, has been settled on the basis that Libya agreed to hand over two suspects for trial in the Scottish courts and to accept responsibility for their actions. One was acquitted, the other convicted, but his conviction has been called into question by the Scottish Criminal Cases Review Commission. There is the possibility of a retrial, and it remains to be seen what effect that might have on the Libya/America soap opera.

On 22 November 2009, The Independent on Sunday published an article by Miles in which he partly questioned the appointment of two British Jewish historians, Sir Lawrence Freedman and Sir Martin Gilbert, to the Iraq inquiry panel because of their background and support for Israel.
