= Simon Webb (civil servant) =

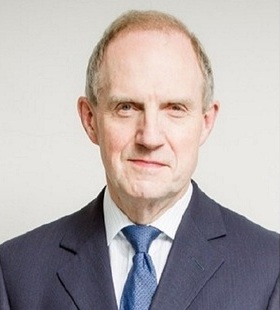
Simon Webb

Simon Webb, CBE (born 21 October 1951) is a British civil servant.

== Biography ==
Webb joined the civil service in 1972, serving with the Ministry of State and with the Treasury. From 1985 to 1988, he worked on naval matters at the Ministry of Defence.

In the early 90s, Webb held a position at the British Embassy in Washington.

Between 2001 and 2004, Webb served as Policy Director at the Ministry of Defence.

Webb gave evidence to The Iraq Inquiry in November 2009.

== Works ==
- Defence Acquisition and Free Markets (1990)
