= Andrew Wood (diplomat) =

British diplomat

Sir Andrew Wood GCMG
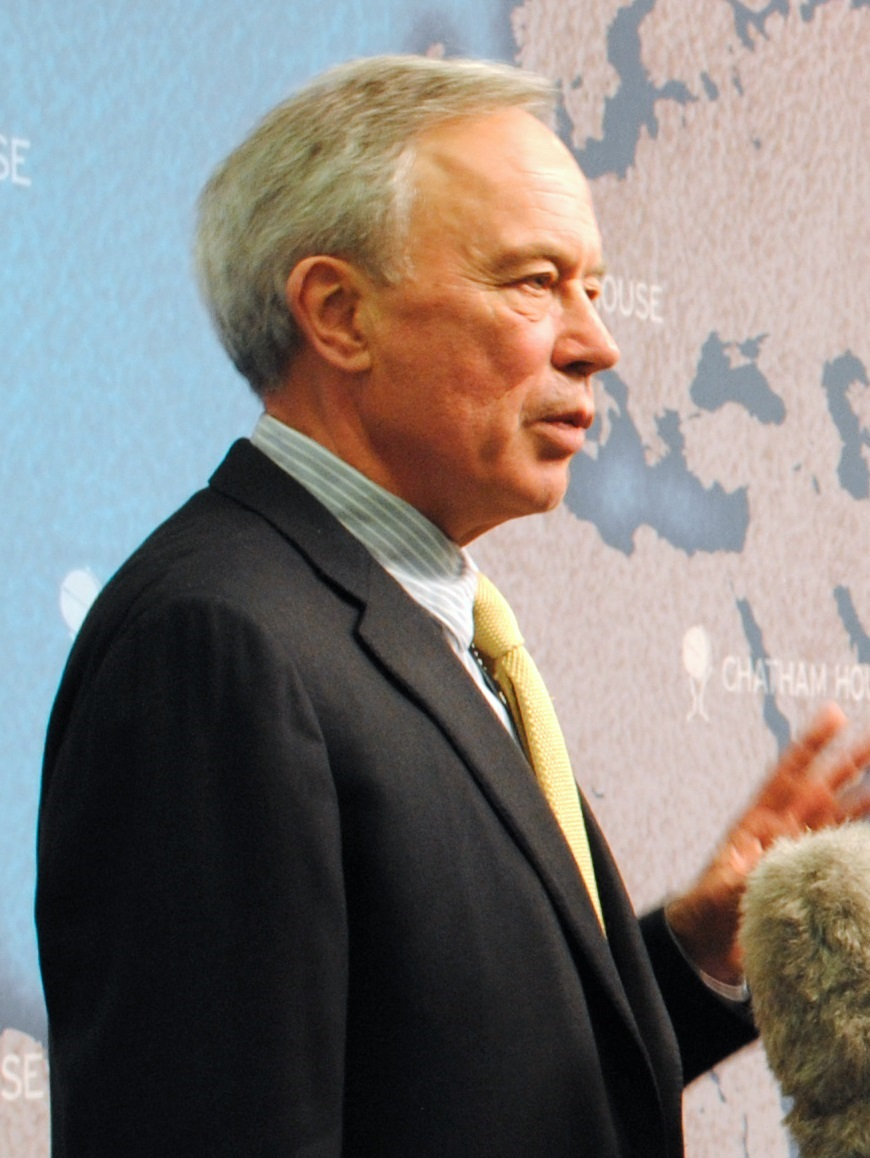
- Wood in 2012

British Ambassador to Russia
- In office 1995–2000
- Prime Minister: John Major; Tony Blair
- Preceded by: Sir Brian Fall
- Succeeded by: Sir Roderic Lyne

British Ambassador to Yugoslavia
- In office 1985–1989
- Prime Minister: Margaret Thatcher
- Preceded by: Sir Kenneth Scott
- Succeeded by: Sir Peter Hall

Personal details
- Born: 2 January 1940 (age 86) Gibraltar
- Education: Ardingly College
- Alma mater: King's College, Cambridge

Sir Andrew Marley Wood GCMG (born 2 January 1940) is a former British diplomat.

Born in Gibraltar, Wood was educated at Ardingly College and King's College, Cambridge. In 1964, he was posted to Moscow by the British Diplomatic Service. Following a range of diplomatic posts he served as British Ambassador to Yugoslavia from 1985 to 1989. From 1995 to 2000 Wood served as British Ambassador to Russia and Moldova before retiring from diplomatic service.

In addition to diplomatic service, Wood has served on the boards or executive councils of several institutions, including the PBN Company, the Russo-British Chamber of Commerce, the Foreign & Colonial Investment Trust, for which he was director, and the Britain Russia Centre, which he chaired. He has been Senior Advisor to or on the advisory boards of the PBN Company, Ernst & Young, Renaissance Capital, and the British Consultants' Bureau. He also advised then British Prime Minister Tony Blair on Russian investment issues. He was made GCMG in 2000, having been made KCMG in 1995 and CMG in 1986.

In January 2017, Wood was revealed by The Independent to be the British diplomat who had played a key role in unsubstantiated claims that Donald Trump was involved in a sex scandal being used as "Kompromat" by Russia to control Trump. When questioned by the newspaper, Wood admitted his role but said "My view is that these are serious matters and that they should be investigated. I don't think I have done anything wrong at all in what I have done."

== Honours ==
- Knight Grand Cross of the Order of St Michael and St George (GCMG) - 2000
