= Hugh Miles =

Hugh Miles may refer to:

- Hugh Miles (filmmaker), British filmmaker
- Hugh Miles (journalist) (born 1977), British journalist
