= Lord Goldsmith =

Lord Goldsmith may refer to:

- Peter Goldsmith, Baron Goldsmith (born 1950), British barrister and Labour politician
- Zac Goldsmith, Baron Goldsmith of Richmond Park (born 1975), British journalist and Conservative politician
