= Hilary Synnott =

British diplomat

Sir Hilary Nicholas Hugh Synnott KCMG (20 March 1945 – 8 September 2011) was a British diplomat who was Regional Coordinator of the Coalition Provisional Authority (CPA) in Southern Iraq from 2003 to 2004, before retiring in 2005. He published a book about his time there called 'Bad Days In Basra'.

== Education ==
Hilary Synnott attended Peterhouse, Cambridge where he was awarded an MA. From 1962 to 1973, he was a Royal Navy officer serving as a submariner.

== Diplomatic career ==
In 1973, Synnott joined the Foreign and Commonwealth Office as Second Secretary. He was posted as First Secretary to UKDEL OECD Paris in 1975 and was transferred to Bonn in 1978. He returned to the FCO in 1981. In November 1985, Synnott was appointed Counsellor, Consul-General and Head of Chancery in Amman. He was Deputy High Commissioner to India from 1993 to 1996. At the FCO, he served as Director for South and South East Asian Affairs from 1996 until 1998. He was appointed British High Commissioner to Pakistan from 2000 until 2003. In his final posting to Iraq, Sir Hilary replaced the Danish Ambassador Ole Wøhlers Olsen who had complained at the lack of support given to his reconstruction efforts.

== Post-retirement ==
On 9 December 2009, Synnott gave evidence to The Iraq Inquiry in which he was critical of the Coalition Provisional Authority.
