= Adolfo Aguilar Zínser =

Mexican scholar, diplomat and politician

Adolfo Aguilar
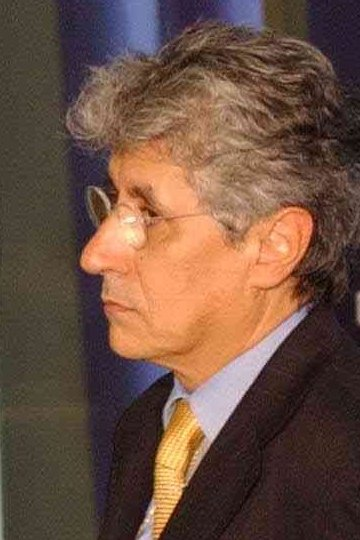

Personal details
- Born: December 2, 1949 Mexico City, Mexico
- Died: June 5, 2005 (aged 55) Tepoztlán, Morelos
- Party: Party of the Democratic Revolution (PRD); Green Ecological Party of Mexico (PVEM)
- Education: National Autonomous University of Mexico; Harvard University

Adolfo Aguilar Zínser (December 2, 1949 – June 5, 2005) was a Mexican scholar, diplomat and politician who served as a National Security Advisor to President Vicente Fox and as a UN Security Council Ambassador in the midst of the US invasion of Iraq.

Born in Mexico City into an upper-class family, Adolfo Aguilar was the son of Adolfo Aguilar y Quevedo a criminal lawyer and Carmen Zínser, a philanthropist. He was also the great-grandson of Miguel Ángel de Quevedo El apóstol del árbol ("Apostle of trees"), considered the first environmentalist in Mexico and Ángela Quevedo de Aguilar a philanthropist.

Aguilar studied law at the National Autonomous University of Mexico, international relations at El Colegio de México (1972–75) and completed a master's degree in international and public affairs at Harvard Kennedy School (1977–78). During the early seventies he briefly subscribed to Marxist ideology, and he headed Luis Echeverría's Center for Economic and Social Studies of the Third World during the mid-1970s.

He was elected to the Chamber of Deputies, representing the Party of the Democratic Revolution (PRD) in 1994 and served until 1997. From 1997 to 2000 he served in the Senate, representing the Green Ecological Party of Mexico (PVEM).

Following Vicente Fox's election to the Presidency (representing a coalition of the National Action Party and the PVEM) on July 2, 2000, Aguilar served as the transition team's advisor on international affairs. After taking office, Fox appointed Aguilar his national security advisor.

In January 2002, Fox appointed Aguilar Mexico's permanent representative to the United Nations. His term coincided with Mexico's election to the Security Council and, in accordance with the Security Council's rules of procedure, he served as its president for two one-month terms.

Following a speech to students at Mexico City's Ibero-American University on November 11, 2003, in which Aguilar claimed that the political and intellectual class of the United States sees Mexico as "a country whose position is that of a back yard" (patio trasero) and that Washington was interested in only "a relationship of convenience and subordination" and "a weekend fling" (un noviazgo de fin de semana), President Fox requested his resignation on 18 November. Two days later, Aguilar announced his resignation in writing accusing Fox of treason and submission to US interests. Aguilar saw nothing controversial in his speech, considering it "obvious and historical"; it was, however, spun in the media to imply that Aguilar himself believed that Mexico was the US's backyard and was thus unworthy to represent the country at the UN. The speech served as a pretext to fire him and placate the US, although Mexico never gave the US what it wanted: support for the 2003 invasion of Iraq.

After leaving the UN, Aguilar received an honorary degree from Ricardo Palma University (Peru) and hosted a weekly current-affairs show on television. He died in a car accident near his summer chalet in Tepoztlán, Morelos, on June 5, 2005, at the age of 55.

In the run-up to the fifth anniversary of the Iraq War he was the subject of an episode of the BBC series 10 Days to War, in which he was played by Tom Conti.
