= Michael Wood (lawyer) =

British lawyer

Principal Legal Adviser to the Foreign and Commonwealth Office
- In office 1999-2006

Personal details
- Born: 5 February 1947 (age 79)
- Education: Trinity Hall, Cambridge

Sir Michael Charles Wood KCMG KC (born 5 February 1947) is a member of the International Law Commission. He also practices as a barrister from chambers at 20 Essex Street, in London.

== Early career ==
Wood was educated at Solihull School, Trinity Hall, Cambridge, and the Free University of Brussels. He was the principal Legal Adviser to the Foreign and Commonwealth Office between 1999 and 2006. During 35 years as a lawyer in the FCO, he attended many international conferences, including the United Nations Conference on the Law of the Sea.

== Biography ==
Wood gave evidence to the Iraq Inquiry in November 2009 and in January 2010, in which he stated that he advised Jack Straw, then Foreign Secretary, that the invasion of Iraq was illegal without a second United Nations resolution.

In 2012, Wood was appointed as Special Rapporteur for the International Law Commission regarding the topic of the "Formation and evidence of customary international law" by the United Nations General Assembly. In 2018, the International Law Commission concluded the "Draft conclusions on identification of customary international law" under his supervision, which the General Assembly acknowledged by resolution 73/203 of 20 December 2018 and brought them to the attention of States.

Wood was Principal Legal Advisor at International Court of Justice advisory opinion on Kosovo's declaration of independence. In March 2023, he was appointed a King's Counsel.
