= Roderic Lyne =

British diplomat (born 1948)

The Right Honourable Sir Roderic Lyne KBE CMG
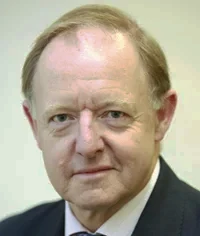

British Ambassador to Russia
- In office 2000–2004
- Prime Minister: Tony Blair
- Preceded by: Andrew Wood
- Succeeded by: Tony Brenton

Permanent Representative to the WTO and UN in Geneva
- In office 1997–2000
- Monarch: Elizabeth II
- Prime Minister: Tony Blair
- Preceded by: Nigel Williams
- Succeeded by: Simon Fuller

Personal details
- Born: Roderic Michael John Lyne; 31 March 1948 (age 78)
- Spouse: Amanda Mary Smith (m. 1969)
- Children: 3
- Education: Leeds University

Sir Roderic Michael John Lyne KBE CMG (born 31 March 1948) is a British former diplomat who served as British ambassador to the Russian Federation from 2000 to 2004.

== Early life and education ==
The son of a senior Royal Air Force officer who flew Spitfires in World War II, Lyne refused to go to Marlborough College because "there were no doors on the lavatories", so instead attended Eton College on a bursary. He went on to read history at Leeds University, which he says was the only university to offer him an interview, on account of his poor A-level grades. Nevertheless, he was a good undergraduate student.

Lyne received an honorary doctorate from Heriot-Watt University in 2004.

== Diplomatic career ==
Rod Lyne joined the Foreign and Commonwealth Office (FCO) in 1970, and went to study at the Army School of Languages in 1971. His first posting was as Third Secretary to Moscow in 1972. He was sent to Dakar in 1974 and returned to the FCO in 1976. He was appointed Assistant Private Secretary to Foreign Secretary Lord Carrington in 1979. Lyne was posted as first secretary to UKMIS New York City in 1982 where he served until 1986, when he was seconded to Chatham House in London. From 1987 to 1990, he was Counsellor and Head of Chancery at the British Embassy in Moscow.

Between 1990 and 1993, Lyne was head of the Soviet and then Eastern Department of the FCO. For three years from 1993, Rod Lyne was seconded to 10 Downing Street as private secretary to Prime Minister John Major, advising on foreign affairs, defence and Northern Ireland. From 1997 to 2000 Lyne served as permanent representative, UKMIS Geneva before finishing his diplomatic career as HM Ambassador to Russia.

On his London postings, he usually commuted to Whitehall by bicycle.

== Post-retirement ==
Sir Roderic Lyne is now vice-chairman at Chatham House where, from 1986 to 1987, he was a visiting research fellow. He is an advisor to JPMorgan Chase, who have been chosen to operate the Trade Bank of Iraq, which will give banks access to the financial system of Iraq. He was a special adviser to BP, which currently has major interests in Iraq. He is a non-executive director of Petropavlovsk plc (formerly Peter Hambro Mining). He is a member of the board of the Russo-British Chamber of Commerce; the board of governors of Kingston University; and is a governor of the Ditchley Foundation.

From 2005 to 2007, he was a member of the Task Force of the Trilateral Commission on Russia. He was a member of the Chilcot inquiry into circumstances leading up to the 2003 invasion of Iraq, having been appointed to the Privy Council in 2009. Several people have commented that he is the toughest inquisitor on the committee. He currently sits on the advisory council of the Front Row Group of Companies Ltd.

== Personal life ==
Rod Lyne married Amanda Mary Smith in 1969. They have two sons (born 1971 and 1974) and one daughter (born 1981).

A fanatical Manchester United supporter, he gave one of his sons the middle name "Charlton" after Bobby Charlton. A keen sportsman and outdoorsman, he took part in a half marathon through the streets of Moscow to publicise the plight of two endangered species of Siberian big cats. He also took on Alastair Campbell over three races in St Petersburg, which Campbell won 2–1.
