= Judith Freedman =

British lawyer and academic

Judith Freedman, Lady Freedman CBE FBA, is a British solicitor and academic.

Freedman is the Pinsent Masons Professor of Taxation Law and Policy at the University of Oxford and senior research fellow at Worcester College. She was the inaugural professor of taxation law at Oxford from 2001 to 2019. She had previously worked in the corporate tax department of Freshfields before joining the University of Surrey as a lecturer in law in 1980. She then moved to the London School of Economics (LSE Law School) with a secondment to the Institute of Advanced Legal Studies as senior research fellow in Company and Commercial Law (1989–92).

== Family ==
She is married to Sir Lawrence Freedman, emeritus professor of war studies at King's College London.
