= 10 Days to War =

2008 British television series

10 Days to War is a series of eight short television dramas commissioned by Newsnight and broadcast on BBC Two between 10 March 2008 and 19 March 2008 to mark the fifth anniversary of the start of the Iraq War. It starred Kenneth Branagh, Toby Jones, Juliet Stevenson, Art Malik, Stephen Rea and Avin Shah.

== Episodes ==
1. A Simple Private Matter: Elizabeth Wilmshurst resigning as Deputy Legal Adviser at the Foreign and Commonwealth Office.
2. $100 Coffee: Ahmed Chalabi holding talks about who will run post-war Iraq.
3. These Things are Always Chaos: Tim Cross' concern about post-war Iraq's security.
4. Why This Rush?: Mexican UN Security Council ambassador Adolfo Aguilar Zínser and negotiations on an UN resolution authorizing a war on Iraq.
5. Blowback: British Muslims discuss how to react to the war.
6. You Are Welcome Here: Weapons inspectors continue their search for weapon of mass destruction in Iraq.
7. Failure is Not an Option: Anne Campbell and Paul Stinchcombe on their votes in the British House of Commons to authorize a war on Iraq.
8. Our Business is North: Colonel Tim Collins preparing his men for war.
