= Douglas Brand =

British criminologist (born 1951)

Douglas Brand OBE

Chief police adviser to the Ministry of the Interior, Iraq
- In office 2003–2005

Personal details
- Born: Douglas Brand; April 28, 1951 (age 75) Watford, Hertfordshire

Douglas Brand OBE (born April 28, 1951) is a British criminologist and retired police officer who was tasked with assisting with the establishment of the newly formed Iraqi Police in the aftermath of the 2003 invasion of Iraq.

== Police career ==
Brand spent 34 years as a police officer, of which over 20 years were spent serving in the Metropolitan Police. While in the Met, Brand was present at the Brixton riots and poll tax riots in the late 1980s and early 1990s. His Met career peaked with him heading the force's public order training centre. Having moved to South Yorkshire Police on appointment as Chief Superintendent, he introduced partnership policing with key agencies that led to the City of Sheffield being statistically the safest city in England by the year 2000.http://news.bbc.co.uk/1/hi/uk/839096.stm Brand's final British police role was as the deputy chief constable of South Yorkshire Police.

== Iraq ==
In July 2003, Brand was one of two British police officers sent to Iraq in order to build up and advise the newly formed Iraqi Police force in the aftermath of the 2003 invasion of Iraq by coalition troops. Brand was made the chief police adviser to the Iraqi Interior Ministry. It was reported in late 2003 that a group of loyalists to the deposed Iraqi President Saddam Hussein put a price on Brand's head. Speaking of his decision to accept the position, Brand said "where else can you design a national police force, design a ministry of interior and mentor a police chief?" and describing the job as "one of the best jobs I have ever had". Brand was made an officer of the Order of the British Empire (OBE) in 2004 for his services in Iraq.

On 11 June 2010, the Iraq Inquiry, a British independent inquiry, led by Sir John Chilcot, into the invasion of Iraq and its aftermath resumed, having recessed for the general election, and named Brand as one of the witnesses to whom the committee would be speaking. In his evidence to the inquiry, Brand stated that British and American officials had overlooked policing requirements, calling the recruitment targets set for the Iraqi police "unrealistic given the chaotic situation in the country" and claiming that the police force never had a "proper foundation".

== Education ==
Brand combined his education while working full time. He earned his undergraduate degree from Birkbeck, University of London, followed by a master's degree in Applied Criminology at Cambridge University. He completed a D Phil in December 2023 at the Centre for Criminology Oxford University.

== Personal life ==
Brand is married with three children. While in Iraq, Brand, 206 centimetres (6 feet 9 inches) tall, earned the nickname the "Tower of London" owing to his distinctive height. Brand is currently working as the technical Advisor to the Inspector General of the National Police Service in Kenya.
