= Peter Goldsmith, Baron Goldsmith =

British barrister (born 1950)

The Right Honourable The Lord Goldsmith PC KC
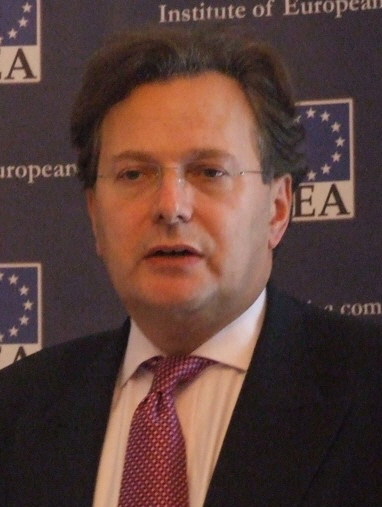

Attorney General for England and Wales; Attorney General for Northern Ireland
- In office 8 June 2001 – 27 June 2007
- Prime Minister: Tony Blair
- Preceded by: The Lord Williams of Mostyn
- Succeeded by: The Baroness Scotland of Asthal

Member of the House of Lords
- Lord Temporal
- Life peerage 29 July 1999

Personal details
- Born: 5 January 1950 (age 76) Liverpool, England
- Party: Labour
- Education: Gonville and Caius College, Cambridge; University College London

Peter Henry Goldsmith, Baron Goldsmith, PC, KC (born 5 January 1950) is a British barrister who served as Attorney General for England and Wales and Attorney General for Northern Ireland from 2001 and 2007. His resignation, announced on 22 June 2007, took effect on 27 June, the same day that Prime Minister Tony Blair stepped down. Goldsmith was the longest serving Labour attorney general. He is currently a partner and head of European litigation practice at US law firm Debevoise & Plimpton and Vice Chairperson of the Hong Kong International Arbitration Centre.

== Biography ==
Goldsmith was born in Liverpool, Lancashire (now Merseyside), and is of Jewish descent. He was educated at Quarry Bank School before reading law at Gonville and Caius College, Cambridge and University College London. He was called to the Bar at Gray's Inn in 1972, practising from Fountain Court Chambers in London. He took silk in 1987 and became a deputy High Court judge in 1994 and he was elected the youngest ever chairman of the Bar of England and Wales in 1995. He was raised to the peerage as a Labour peer in 1999, as Baron Goldsmith, of Allerton in the County of Merseyside. He was appointed Her Majesty's Attorney General in June 2001. One of his first acts was to discuss breaches of the injunction against publishing the whereabouts of the offenders in the murder of James Bulger. He was sworn of the Privy Council in 2002.

Goldsmith has also held a number of posts in international legal organisations, including Council Member of the International Bar Association (IBA) and of the Union Internationale des Avocats. From 1998 until his appointment as Attorney General he was co-chairman of the IBA's Human Rights Institute. Between 1997 and 2000 he was Chairman of the Financial Reporting Review Panel, a non-departmental public body responsible for enforcing financial reporting standards. In 1997 he was elected to membership of the American Law Institute and made a member of the Paris Bar.

In 1996 he founded the Bar Pro Bono Unit (now Advocate ) of which he was chairman until 2000 and remains president. He was the Prime Minister's Personal Representative to the Convention for the Charter of Fundamental Rights of the European Union.

In November 2006, he visited a number of pro bono legal and criminal justice charities in Kenya, including Philemon Ministries.

In 2006, Goldsmith gave a speech at the Royal United Services Institute, calling for the closure of the US detention camp at Guantanamo Bay. Goldsmith called it a "symbol of injustice", and said that it did not respect the rights of liberty or freedom.

In 2007 he won a High Court injunction against the BBC, preventing reporting of aspects of the New Labour Cash-for-Honours scandal by successfully arguing a broadcast of confidential information would have harmed a police inquiry.

== Al-Yamamah arms deal controversy ==
In 2007, Goldsmith was accused of attempting to cover up the BAE-Saudi corruption case by ordering the Serious Fraud Office to call off its ongoing investigation into the matter, arguing that it might "compromise national security."

He later admitted that the MI6 had never possessed intelligence that Saudi Arabia planned to cut security links with Britain.

== Invasion of Iraq controversy ==
The nature of Goldsmith's legal advice to the government over the legality of the 2003 invasion of Iraq was a significant political issue at the time.

The government turned down repeated calls to break with tradition and have the advice made public. Goldsmith's original memo to the prime minister written on 30 January 2003 opined that UN Resolution 1441 did not sanction the use of force and that a further resolution would be required before military action. A subsequent memo written on 7 March 2003 was eventually leaked to the press, which led to its official publication on 28 April 2005. In the memo, Lord Goldsmith discussed whether the use of force in Iraq could legally be justified by Iraq's 'material breach', as established in UN Security Council Resolution 1441, of its ceasefire obligations as imposed by Security Council Resolution 687 at the end of the First Gulf War. Goldsmith concluded that "a reasonable case can be made that resolution 1441 is capable in principle of reviving the authorisation [of the use of force] in Resolution 678 without a further resolution." However, Goldsmith did concede that "a court might well conclude that operative paragraphs 4 and 12 do require a further Council decision to revive the authorisation." In this memo he also concluded "the argument that resolution 1441 alone has revived the authorisation to use force in resolution 678 will only be sustainable if there are strong factual grounds for concluding that Iraq has failed to take the final opportunity. In other words, we would need to be able to demonstrate hard evidence of non-compliance and non-cooperation."

In his final advice to the government, written on 17 March 2003, Goldsmith stated that the use of force in Iraq was lawful. This advice stated Goldsmith's preferred view in more unequivocal terms than his earlier memo, without reference to the doubts expressed therein. This has led to allegations that Goldsmith succumbed to political pressure to find legal justification for the use of force against Iraq. Shortly after the leak Goldsmith released a statement in response to such allegations, saying that the two documents were consistent, pointing to the difference in the nature of the two documents and to the firm assurances he claims to have had received between 7 and 17 March that Iraq was indeed in breach of its obligations under Security Council resolutions.

The controversy was heightened by the resignation of Elizabeth Wilmshurst, deputy legal adviser at the Foreign and Commonwealth Office, on 20 March 2003. A full version of her letter of resignation became public in March 2005. In this, Wilmshurst stated that the reason for her resignation was that she did not agree with the official opinion that the use of force in Iraq was legal. She also accused Goldsmith of changing his view on the matter. In the course of her testimony to the Iraq Inquiry commission, Wilmshurst, even though she understood that "Goldsmith was put into an impossible position", expressed her disapproval of the way Goldsmith set about in formulating his eventual opinion. She said she thought "the process that was followed in this case was lamentable," adding that she believed "there should have been a greater transparency within [the British] government" about the "evolving legal advice." On the efforts of the Attorney General to determine the nature of the alleged Iraqi breaches, she expressed her disapproval of Goldsmith relying, in part, for his legal opinion, "on private conversations he had with British and US negotiators on what the French [negotiators] had said," while "of course, he hadn't asked the French themselves."

In November 2008, the former Lord Chief Justice and Senior Law Lord Lord Bingham of Cornhill stated that Goldsmith's advice contained "no hard evidence" that Iraq had defied UN resolutions "in a manner justifying resort to force" and that the invasion was "a serious violation of international law and of the rule of law."

Goldsmith gave evidence to the Iraq Inquiry on 27 January 2010, in which he was asked to explain his position on the legality of the invasion of Iraq.

In July 2017, former Iraqi general Abdulwaheed al-Rabbat launched a private war crimes prosecution, in the High Court in London, asking for Goldsmith, Tony Blair and former foreign secretary Jack Straw to be prosecuted for "the crime of aggression" for their role in the 2003 invasion of Iraq. The High Court ruled that, although the crime of aggression was recognised in international law, it was not an offence under UK law, and, therefore, the prosecution could not proceed.

== Present position ==
Goldsmith has been appointed head of European Litigation at the London office of US law firm Debevoise & Plimpton. He was the first retiring UK Attorney General ever to join a law firm. In August 2008, Goldsmith qualified as a solicitor of the Supreme Court of England and Wales to become a full equity partner of the firm (and so share in the firm's profits and acquire an ownership share in the firm). He was reported – by The Guardian newspaper on 27 September 2007 – to be remunerated at the rate of £1 million a year in his new position. The same report said that he would have expected to earn more than that if he had resumed practice at the English Bar. His former chambers are Fountain Court.

Upon leaving office, former attorneys general usually return to practise at the Bar, often at the chambers which they left upon appointment as attorney. Unlike the position with retired lord chancellors, there is no prohibition on an attorney general returning to practise at the Bar.

As a former minister and holder of public office, Goldsmith had to accept a number of restrictions on his freedom to practise for two years after leaving office. The restrictions are imposed by the prime minister on the advice of the Advisory Committee on Business Appointments, a branch of the Cabinet Office.

Goldsmith's restrictions prevented him, for 12 months after leaving office, from being personally involved in lobbying government Ministers or officials. For two years after leaving office, he was required to stand aside from dealing with any matter about which he had confidential or privileged information acquired while he was Attorney General.

In August 2008, Goldsmith was appointed as an independent non-executive director of the Australian property trust, Westfield Group.

In November 2025, Goldsmith returned to Fountain Court Chambers.

== Arms ==
Coat of arms of Peter Goldsmith, Baron Goldsmith
Crest A male griffin sejant Sable beaked forelegged rayed and grasping in the dexter forefoot a hammer bendwise sinister Or. Escutcheon Argent on each of two bars Sable between six hearts three two and one Gules two sword blades issuing fesswise. Supporters On either side a coromorant Proper beaked and legged Or beneath the exterior wing a scroll that on the dexter bendwise and that on the sinister bendwise sinister Argent. Motto Ad Aurum Industria Et Fortuna (Through Industry And Good Luck To Gold)

Political offices
Preceded by The Lord Williams of Mostyn	Attorney General for England and Wales; 2001–2007	Succeeded by The Baroness Scotland of Asthal
Preceded by The Lord Williams of Mostyn	Attorney General for Northern Ireland; 2001–2007	Succeeded by The Baroness Scotland of Asthal
Orders of precedence in the United Kingdom
Preceded by The Lord Waldegrave of North Hill	Gentlemen; Baron Goldsmith	Followed by The Lord Filkin
