= Hugh Miles (journalist) =

British journalist

Hugh Miles is a freelance journalist and author, a presenter, producer and consultant specialising in the Middle East. Miles is an editor of Arab Digest, a private members club offering commentary and analysis on the Middle East and North Africa which was founded by his father, British diplomat Oliver Miles. He is also the director of Al Shafie Miles, a "business intelligence consultancy specialising in the Middle East and North Africa".

== Background ==
Hugh Miles is the son of retired British diplomat Oliver Miles and his wife Julia (née Weiner), a psychotherapist. He was born in Jedda, Saudi Arabia in 1977. Miles was educated in Libya, at the Dragon School, Oxford, and at Eton. He studied Arabic at Pembroke College, Oxford University, and English Literature at Trinity College, Dublin. During a one-year student exchange programme with the Sorbonne University in Paris, Miles worked as the Nightlife Editor for Time Out Paris, also reviewing restaurants and shops. His work included sampling every crêpe house in Paris.

On the day Miles graduated from university, he flew to Beverly Hills, Los Angeles, to start work as a development director for Oscar-winning producer Michael Phillips (Taxi Driver, Close Encounters of the Third Kind, The Sting). Besides working on a big budget script set in wartime Cairo, he helped package movies, raise finance, attract talent, manage scriptwriters and pitch projects.

He is married to an Egyptian psychiatrist named Dina. They have three children and live in Cairo.

== Journalist ==
Miles' first and most formative experience of professional journalism was as an office boy at the News of the World in Dublin. In 2000, Miles was chosen as The Times/Sky News Young Journalist of the Year.

Among his many published articles are:

- "Watching the War on Al Jazeera"
- "Inconvenient Truths"
- "Lockerbie: was it Iran? Syria? All I know is, it wasn't the man in prison"
- "Lockerbie Trial is an Historic Miscarriage of Justice"

Miles's reporting on Saudi Arabia has appeared on the front pages of the Guardian, Telegraph, Independent and New York Times. In 2015 he broke the exclusive story that a senior Saudi prince was calling for regime change in Saudi Arabia, an historic development that was picked up globally and even impacted on the Tadawul or Saudi stock market.

In March 2016 he wrote the seminal Guardian article exposing the Saudi government's secret kidnap programme targeting defectors and dissidents living in the West.

In 2017 Miles produced the investigative BBC TV documentary "Kidnapped! Saudi Arabia's Missing Princes" about the Saudi government's secret programme to kidnap and murder Saudi defectors and dissidents living in Europe. The programme was broadcast in September 2017 on BBC Newsnight, BBC World, BBC Arabic and BBC News.

In 2018 Miles was Specialist Producer on the critically acclaimed BBC 2 series "House of Saud - Family at War" which was broadcast in January and February Feb 2018.

In February 2018 Miles worked on the BBC investigation into the so-called "anti-corruption drive" that saw many Saudi princes and business moguls locked up in the Riyadh Ritz-Carlton. The programme was broadcast on BBC Newsnight and lead to the prompt release of one of the highest profile detainees, Prince Walid bin Talal.

In March 2018 Miles worked on the BBC investigation the case of Princess Latifa Al Maktoum, the daughter of the billionaire ruler of Dubai Sheikh Mohammed Bin Rashid Al Maktoum. She tried to flee Dubai for India but the yacht she was travelling on was stormed by the Indian coast guard near Goa and she was taken back to her father's palace by force.

In October 2018 Miles worked on the BBC investigation into the murder of Jamal Khashoggi for the fast turnaround documentary "Saudi Crown Prince on Trial". He also worked with BBC Newsnight on several other Khashoggi related TV programmes including "What we know so far", "What more can we learn from his death?" and a profile of Prince Mohammed bin Salman.

== Consultant ==
Miles is an editor of Arab Digest, a private members club offering commentary and analysis on the Middle East and North Africa. Arab Digest was originally founded by his father, British diplomat Oliver Miles. He is also the director of Al Shafie Miles, a "business intelligence consultancy specialising in the Middle East and North Africa".

== Author ==
Hugh Miles is the author of two books:

- "Al Jazeera: How Arab TV News Challenged the World" (2005)
- "Playing Cards in Cairo" (2008)
