= Peter Hall (diplomat) =

British diplomat (1938–2024)

Sir Peter Edward Hall KBE CMG (26 July 1938 – 12 June 2024) was a British diplomat. He was educated at Portsmouth Grammar School and Pembroke College, Cambridge. He was British Ambassador to Yugoslavia from 1989 to 1992 and Ambassador to Argentina from 1993 to 1997.

Hall died from complications of Parkinson's disease on 12 June 2024, at the age of 85.
