= John Chilcot =

British civil servant (1939–2021)

The Right Honourable Sir John Chilcot GCB
- Chilcot in 1980

Permanent Under-Secretary of State for Northern Ireland
- In office 1990–1997

Personal details
- Born: John Anthony Chilcot; 22 April 1939 Surrey, England
- Died: 3 October 2021 (aged 82) Devon, England
- Spouse: Rosalind Forster (m. 1964)
- Education: Brighton College
- Alma mater: Pembroke College, Cambridge
- Occupation: Civil servant

Sir John Anthony Chilcot (/ˈtʃɪlkɒt/; 22 April 1939 – 3 October 2021) was a British civil servant.

In 2009, Chilcot was appointed chairman of the Iraq Inquiry (also referred to as the "Chilcot Inquiry"), an inquiry into the circumstances surrounding the Iraq War (2003).

== Career ==
A career civil servant until his retirement in 1997, Chilcot served as Permanent Under-Secretary of State at the Northern Ireland Office, Deputy Under-Secretary at the Home Office in charge of the Police Department, and a variety of posts in the Home Office, the Civil Service Department and the Cabinet Office, including Private Secretary appointments to Home Secretaries Roy Jenkins, Merlyn Rees, and William Whitelaw, and to the Head of the Civil Service, William Armstrong.

Chilcot acted as "staff counsellor" to MI5 and MI6 from 1999 to 2004, "dealing with private and personal complaints from members of the intelligence services about their work and conditions".

Chilcot became a member of the Privy Council of the United Kingdom in 2004, which gave him the prenominal style 'The Right Honourable'.

=== The Butler Review (2004) ===
Chilcot was a member of the Butler Review of the misuse of intelligence in the run-up to the invasion of Iraq in 2003.

=== Chilcot Inquiry (2009–2016) ===
On 15 June 2009, the then British prime minister Gordon Brown announced that Chilcot would chair an inquiry into the Iraq War, despite his participation in the discredited secret Butler report. Opposition parties, campaigners and back bench members of the governing Labour Party condemned the decision to hold the inquiry in secret and its highly restrictive terms of reference which would not, for example, permit any blame to be apportioned.

In 2015, Chilcot was criticised as the Inquiry remained unpublished after six years. The head of Her Majesty's Civil Service Sir Jeremy Heywood said the inquiry had repeatedly turned down offers of extra assistance to help speed up the report. On 29 October 2015, it was announced that the inquiry would be published in June or July 2016.

The report was published on 6 July 2016, more than seven years after the inquiry was announced. The report stated that at the time of the invasion of Iraq in 2003, Saddam Hussein did not pose an urgent threat to British interests, that intelligence regarding weapons of mass destruction was presented with too much certainty, that peaceful options to war had not been exhausted, that the United Kingdom and United States had undermined the authority of the United Nations Security Council, that the process of identifying the legal basis was "far from satisfactory", and that a war was unnecessary.

=== Later work ===
Chilcot was president of Britain's independent policing think tank, The Police Foundation.

== Personal life and death ==
Chilcot was born on 22 April 1939, and educated at Brighton College and Pembroke College, Cambridge, where he read English and modern and mediaeval languages.

He died from kidney disease on 3 October 2021, at the age of 82.

== Honours ==
Chilcot was appointed a Companion of the Order of the Bath (CB) in the 1990 Birthday Honours before being promoted to Knight Commander (KCB) in the 1994 New Year Honours and Knight Grand Cross (GCB) in the 1998 New Year Honours.
