= Iraq Inquiry =

2009 British public inquiry into the Iraq War

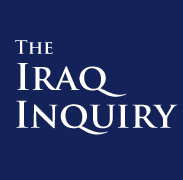
- Date: Hearings: 24 November 2009 – 2 February 2011; Report: 6 July 2016
- Location: London, United Kingdom
- Also known as: Chilcot Inquiry (or Report)
- Participants: Sir John Chilcot (chairman); Sir Lawrence Freedman; Sir Martin Gilbert; Sir Roderic Lyne; Baroness Prashar
- Website: www.iraqinquiry.org.uk

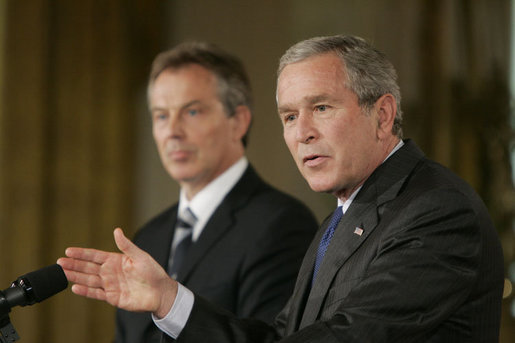
Tony Blair and George W. Bush on 28 July 2006

The Iraq Inquiry (also referred to as the Chilcot Inquiry after its chairman, Sir John Chilcot) was a British public inquiry into the nation's role in the Iraq War. The inquiry was announced in 2009 by Prime Minister Gordon Brown and published in 2016 with a public statement by Chilcot.

On 6 July 2016, Sir John Chilcot announced the report's publication, more than seven years after the inquiry was announced. Usually referred to as the Chilcot report by the news media, the document stated that at the time of the invasion of Iraq in 2003, Saddam Hussein did not pose an urgent threat to British interests, that intelligence regarding weapons of mass destruction was presented with unwarranted certainty, that peaceful alternatives to war had not been exhausted, that the United Kingdom and the United States had undermined the authority of the United Nations Security Council, that the process of identifying the legal basis was "far from satisfactory", and that a war was unnecessary. The report was made available under an Open Government Licence.

== Build-up ==
It was initially established by Prime Minister Gordon Brown that the Iraq Inquiry would be held in camera, excluding the public and press. However, the decision was later deferred to Sir John Chilcot, the inquiry chairman, who said that it was "essential to hold as much of the proceedings of the inquiry as possible in public". In July 2009, when the inquiry commenced, it was announced that the committee would be able to request any British document and call any British citizen to give evidence. In the week before the inquiry began hearing witnesses, a series of documents including military reports were leaked to a newspaper which appeared to show poor post-war planning and lack of provisions.

== History ==
The inquiry was pursued by a committee of Privy Counsellors with broad terms of reference to consider Britain's involvement in Iraq between 2001 and 2009. It covered the run-up to the conflict, the subsequent military action and its aftermath to establish how decisions were made, to determine what happened and to identify lessons to ensure that, in a similar situation in future, the British government is equipped to respond in the most effective manner in the best interests of the country. The open sessions of the inquiry commenced on 24 November 2009 and concluded on 2 February 2011.

In 2012, the government vetoed the release to the inquiry of documents detailing minutes of Cabinet meetings in the days leading up to the invasion of Iraq in 2003. Concurrently, the Foreign Office successfully appealed against a judge's ruling and blocked the disclosure of extracts of a conversation between George W. Bush and Tony Blair days before the invasion. The government stated that revealing this conversation would present a "significant danger" to British–American relations. The million-word report of the inquiry was due to be released to the public by 2014, but difficult negotiations were continuing with the United States over the publication of documents.

The Lord-in-waiting Lord Wallace of Saltaire said on behalf of the government that it would be "inappropriate" to publish the report in the months leading up to the next general election in 2015. In August, it transpired that the Report would in any event be further delayed, possibly into 2016, due to the legal requirement of "Maxwellisation", allowing any person who is to be criticised a fair opportunity to comment on a draft prior to finalisation and publication. Chilcot wrote a letter to David Cameron in October 2015, stating that the text of the report could be complete by April 2016, and proposing a release date in June or July 2016.

== Committee members ==
The committee of inquiry, the members of which were chosen by Gordon Brown, comprised:

- Sir John Chilcot (chairman), a career diplomat and senior civil servant who was previously a member of the Butler Review;
- Sir Lawrence Freedman, a military historian, and Professor of War Studies at King's College London. His memo outlining five tests for military intervention was used by Tony Blair in drafting his Chicago foreign policy speech;
- Sir Martin Gilbert (died 3 February 2015), a historian who supported the invasion of Iraq and claimed in 2004 that George W. Bush and Blair may one day "join the ranks of Roosevelt and Churchill";
- Sir Roderic Lyne, former Ambassador to Russia and to the United Nations in Geneva, previously served as private secretary to Prime Minister John Major; and
- Usha Prashar, Baroness Prashar, a crossbencher, member of the UK Parliament's Joint Committee on Human Rights, and the chairwoman of the Judicial Appointments Commission.

The committee also received secretarial support during proceedings from Margaret Aldred.

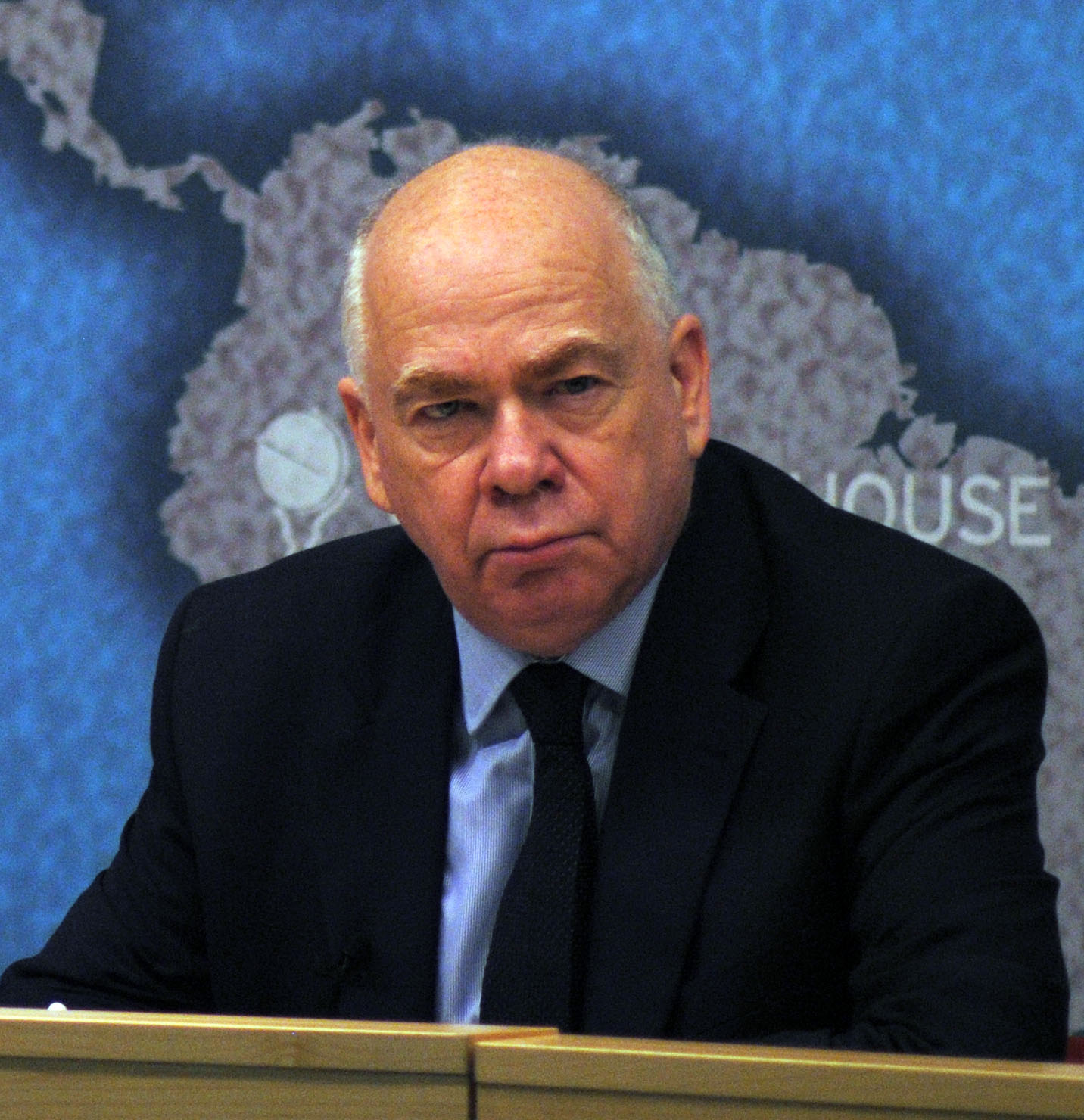
Professor
Sir Lawrence Freedman
Military Historian

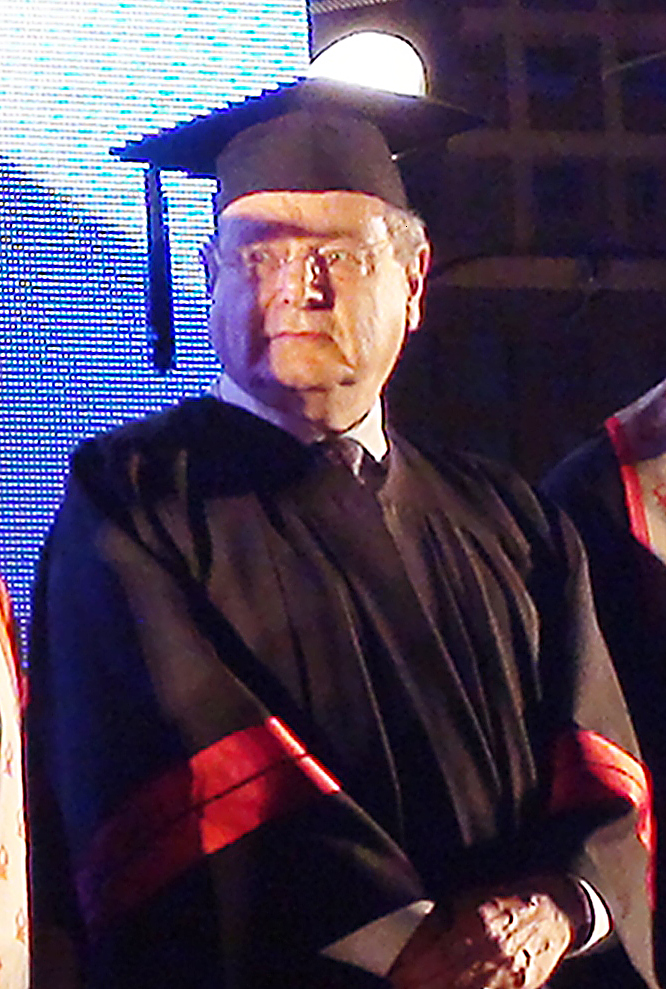
Sir Martin Gilbert
Historian

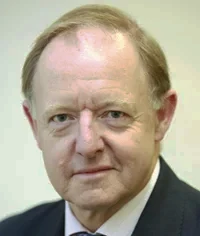
Sir Roderic Lyne
Former Diplomat

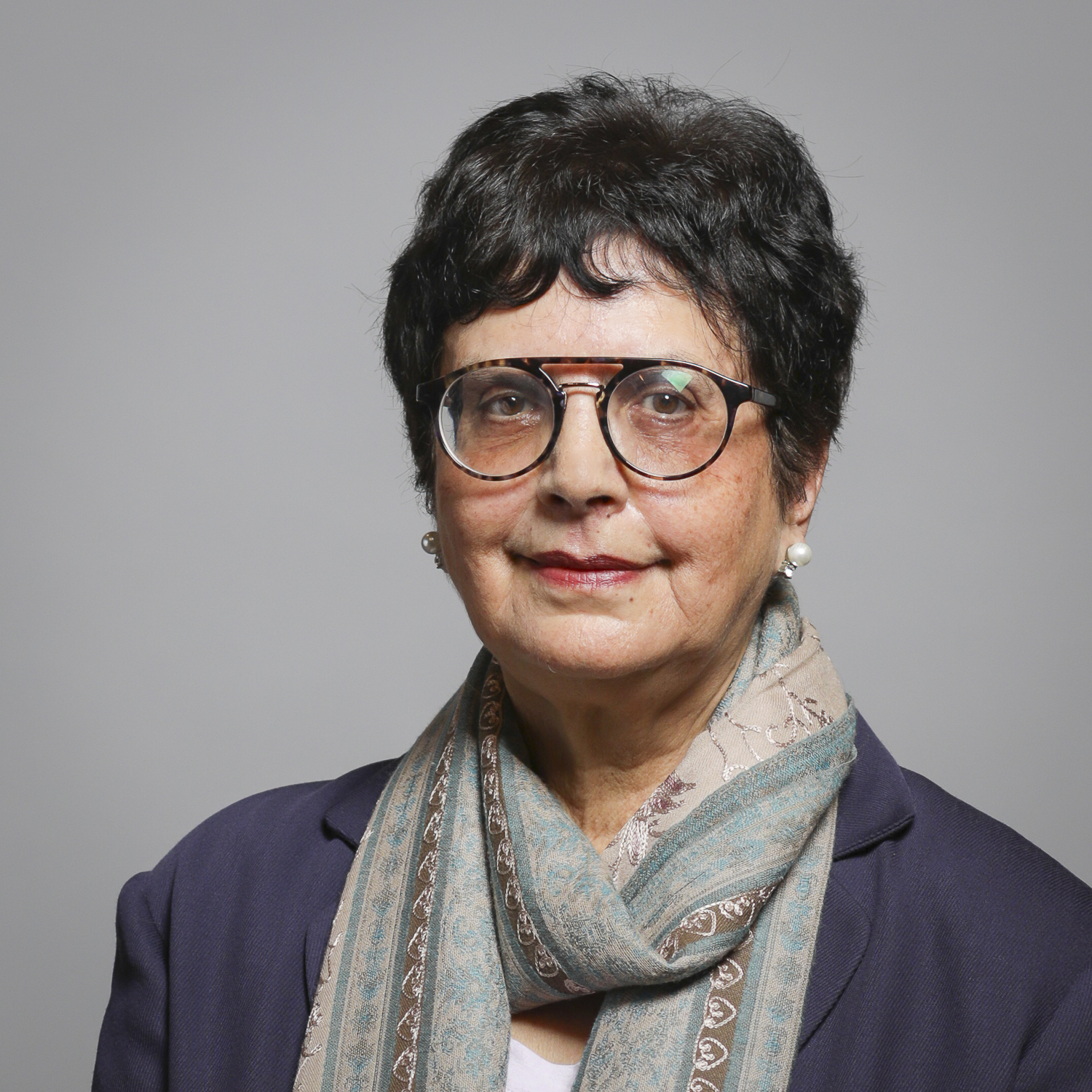
Usha Prashar, Baroness Prashar
Member of the Joint Committee on Human Rights

=== Advisors to the committee ===
- General Sir Roger Wheeler, former Chief of the General Staff and Commander in Chief Land Forces.
- Rosalyn Higgins, Lady Higgins, former President of the International Court of Justice.

== Proceedings ==
When the inquiry was announced on 15 June 2009 by Prime Minister Gordon Brown, it was initially announced that proceedings would take place in private, a decision which was subsequently reversed after receiving criticism in the media and the House of Commons.

The inquiry commenced in July 2009, with public hearings commencing on 24 November 2009 with Peter Ricketts, chairman of the Joint Intelligence Committee at the time of the invasion of Iraq, as the first witness. Opening the proceedings, Sir John Chilcot announced that the inquiry was not seeking to apportion blame but that it would "get to the heart of what happened" and would not "shy away" from making criticism where it was justified. The commission resumed its hearings in January 2011 with the former prime minister, Tony Blair as its prime witness.

=== 29 October Protocol ===
On 29 October 2009, HM Government published a Protocol in agreement with the Iraq Inquiry on the treatment of sensitive written and electronic information. Evidence which will not be made available to the public includes anything likely to:

- a) cause harm or damage to the public interest, guided by the normal and established principles under which the balance of public interest is determined on grounds of public interest immunity in proceedings in England and Wales, including, but not limited to,
  - i) national security, defence interests or international relations;
  - ii) the economic interests of the United Kingdom or of any part of the United Kingdom;
- b) endanger the life of an individual or otherwise risk serious harm to an individual;
- c) make public commercially sensitive information;
- d) breach the principle of legal professional privilege (LPP);
- e) prejudice, in the case of legal advice (following any voluntary waiver of LPP) rather than material facts, the position of HMG in relation to ongoing legal proceedings;
- f) breach the rules of law which would apply in proceedings in England and Wales under the provisions of Section 17 of the Regulation of Investigatory Powers Act 2000;
- g) breach the rules of law applicable to the disclosure of information by the Security Service, SIS or GCHQ, the third party rule governing non-disclosure of intelligence material or other commitments or understandings governing the release of sensitive information;
- h) breach the Data Protection Act 1998; or
- i) prejudice the course or outcome of any ongoing statutory or criminal inquiry into matters relating to the information proposed for release.

== Witnesses ==
The inquiry heard evidence from a variety of witnesses, such as politicians, including several cabinet ministers at the time of the invasion; senior civil servants, including lawyers and intelligence chiefs; diplomats, mostly composed of British ambassadors to Iraq and the United States; and high-ranking military officers including former Chiefs of the General Staff and Chiefs of the Defence Staff as well as senior operational commanders.

The inquiry heard mostly from civil servants, intelligence and security officials, diplomats and military officers from the first public hearings up until it recessed for Christmas. Key witnesses included Sir Christopher Meyer, former ambassador to the United States; Admiral Lord Boyce, former Chief of the Defence Staff; Sir John Scarlett, Chief of the Secret Intelligence Service; Major-General Tim Cross, the most senior British officer on the ground in the aftermath of the invasion; and Air Chief Marshal Sir Brian Burridge, overall commander of British forces in the invasion.

Former Prime Minister Tony Blair was publicly questioned by the enquiry on 29 January 2010, and again on 21 January 2011. On both of these occasions protests took place outside the conference centre. Because of widespread public interest in Blair's evidence, public access to the hearings had to be allocated by lottery. Special dispensations to attend were allocated to those whose close family were casualties of the war, some of whom shouted angry accusations at Blair during his second appearance.

From the inquiry's resumption in January 2010, it heard predominantly from politicians and former government officials, including Alastair Campbell, Tony Blair's director of communications and on 2 February 2010, then-Secretary of State for International Development Clare Short, when she repeatedly criticised Blair, Attorney General Peter Goldsmith and others in the UK Government for what she maintained was deceiving her and other MPs in an attempt to obtain consent for the invasion of Iraq.

Gordon Brown had to retract his claim that spending on defence rose every year during the Iraq war, as this was found not to have been the case.

Following a recess to avoid influencing the general election, the inquiry resumed public hearings on 29 June 2010. The first witness was Douglas Brand, chief police adviser to the Iraqi Interior Ministry from 2003 to 2005.

The final witness in the public hearings, heard on 2 February 2011, was Jack Straw, Foreign Secretary from 2001 to 2006.

== Publication ==
The Inquiry's final report was published on 6 July 2016. Comprising 2.6 million words in 12 volumes, plus an executive summary, a physical copy was priced at £767. Bereaved families received a free copy. It was also published online.

The report was made available under the Open Government Licence v3.0, although this excluded material supplied by third parties.

== Findings ==
The report – described by BBC News as "damning", by The Guardian as a "crushing verdict", and by The Telegraph as "scathing" – was broadly critical of the actions of the British government and military in making the case for the war, in tactics and in planning for the aftermath of the Iraq War. Richard Norton-Taylor of The Guardian wrote that the report "could hardly be more damning" of Tony Blair and "was an unprecedented, devastating indictment of how a prime minister was allowed to make decisions by discarding all pretence at cabinet government, subverting the intelligence agencies, and making exaggerated claims about threats to Britain's national security".

=== Case for war was deficient ===
The report found that in the run-up to the war, peaceful diplomatic options to avoid instability and WMD proliferation had not been exhausted, and that the war was therefore "not a last resort". Intervention might have become necessary later, but at the time of the invasion of Iraq in 2003, Saddam Hussein did not pose an immediate threat and the majority of the UN Security Council supported the continuation of UN weapons inspections and monitoring.

The report does not question Blair's personal belief that there was a case for war, only the way he presented the evidence that he had. The report cleared the Prime Minister's Office of influencing the Iraq Dossier (the "Dodgy Dossier"), which contained the claim that Iraq possessed the ability to launch WMD within 45 minutes, and instead laid the blame for the weaknesses in its evidence on the Joint Intelligence Committee.

More specifically, the report blamed Secret Intelligence Service (better known as MI6) head Richard Dearlove who presented so-called "hot" intelligence about alleged weapons of mass destruction provided by an Iraqi with "phenomenal access" to high levels in the Iraqi government directly to Blair, without first confirming its accuracy. The investigators found that references to this intelligence in government reports were over-certain and did not adequately stress uncertainties and nuance. The informant was later found to have been lying. The Chilcot report states that "personal intervention [by Dearlove] and its urgency gave added weight to a report that had not been properly evaluated and would have coloured the perception of ministers and senior officials". The day after the report was published, Blair conceded that he should have challenged such intelligence reports before relying on them to justify military action in Iraq.

Some MI6 staff had also expressed concerns about the quality of its source – in particular, noting that an inaccurate detail about storing chemical weapons in glass containers appeared to have been taken from the 1996 action film The Rock – and expressed doubts about its reliability. Nonetheless, Foreign Secretary Jack Straw asked MI6 to use the source to provide "silver bullet intelligence".

=== Legal process was far from satisfactory ===
The inquiry did not concern the legality of military action and could not rule on the topic, as it was not an internationally recognised court. However, the report did criticise the process by which the government investigated the legal basis for the war, finding it "far from satisfactory". Lord Goldsmith, the Attorney General, should have provided a detailed written report to Cabinet but was instead asked to provide oral evidence without extensive questioning, and he did not explain what the basis would be for deciding whether Iraq had violated United Nations Security Council Resolution 1441. Goldsmith's advice changed between January 2003 – when he said that a second resolution was necessary – and March 2003 – when he said that Resolution 1441 was sufficient – and the report describes pressure being applied by the Prime Minister's Office to get Goldsmith to revise his opinion. By ultimately going to war without a Security Council resolution, the UK was "undermining the Security Council's authority".

=== UK overestimated ability to influence US decisions on Iraq ===
The report found that Blair had attempted to persuade Bush of the need to seek support from the UN, European allies and Arab states, but that he "overestimated his ability to influence US decisions on Iraq". The report accused Blair personally of being too conciliatory towards the US, saying: "Despite concerns about the state of US planning, he did not make an agreement on a satisfactory post-conflict plan a condition of UK participation in military action", and drew attention to a sentence from a private memo from Blair to Bush which read "I will be with you, whatever". Contrary to Tony Blair's claims, Chilcot found that the Special Relationship did not require unquestioning agreement between the UK and the US, and the report identified several previous occasions where one country had gone to war without the other without long-term damage to diplomatic relations, including the Vietnam War and Falklands War.

=== War preparation and planning was "wholly inadequate" ===
The report found that British planning for a post-Ba'athist Iraq was "wholly inadequate" and that the Ministry of Defence (MoD) left UK forces in Iraq without adequate equipment or a plan. It also found that there was no ministerial oversight of post-conflict strategy.

Initial planning for the war assumed an invasion from the north, but Turkey refused permission for UK troops to cross its border. Plans were therefore completely rewritten two months before the war began with insufficient time to assess the dangers or prepare the brigades.

Soldiers were not issued with key equipment, and there were shortfalls in the provision of helicopters, armoured vehicles and in reconnaissance and intelligence assets. In addition, the MoD was slow to respond to the threat of improvised explosive devices (IEDs).

Although military officials presented several concerns about the risks of the war, the report found that this was not taken into account in planning. "The risks of internal strife in Iraq, active Iranian pursuit of its interests, regional instability and Al Qaeda activity in Iraq were each explicitly identified before the invasion". A "can-do" attitude among military officials also led them to downplay dangers and setbacks during briefings.

The report also described the situation in the city of Basra, where British forces were forced to make a deal with insurgents to end attacks on British troops, as "humiliating".

=== Military action did not achieve its goals ===
According to the report, British military action did not achieve its goals, and Baghdad and south-east Iraq destabilised rapidly in the wake of the invasion.

At the time, the UK was also involved in the War in Afghanistan and military commanders felt that there was more potential for success there, which meant that equipment, manpower and the attention of commanders were diverted from Iraq in the later stages of the war, exacerbating difficulties.

== Reactions and analysis ==
In a statement to the House of Commons the afternoon after the inquiry's report was released, the then Prime Minister David Cameron refused to say whether the Iraq War was "a mistake" or "wrong" and rejected calls for an apology to be issued on behalf of the Conservative Party for its role in the lead-up to the war. Cameron said that he did not see "a huge amount of point" in "replaying all the arguments of the day" and said that focus should instead be on learning "the lessons of what happened and what needs to be put in place to make sure that mistakes cannot be made in future".

The same day, US State Department spokesperson John Kirby stated in the daily White House press briefing that the US would not respond to the report and that reporters should direct their questions to British officials instead, explaining that their focus was now on Syria rather than a decision made 13 years prior: "... we're not going to make a judgment one way or the other about this report, and I'll let British officials speak to the degree to which they intend to derive lessons learned from it. That's really, again, for them to talk to. We're not going to go through it, we're not going to examine it, we're not going to try to do an analysis of it or make a judgment of the findings one way or the other. Our focus, again, is on the challenges we have in Iraq and Syria right now, and that's where our focus is".

After the report was issued, Jeremy Corbyn, the leader of the opposition and leader of the Labour Party – who had voted against military action – gave a speech in Westminster stating: "I now apologise sincerely on behalf of my party for the disastrous decision to go to war in Iraq in March 2003" which he called an "act of military aggression launched on a false pretext" something that has "long been regarded as illegal by the overwhelming weight of international opinion". Corbyn specifically apologised to "the people of Iraq"; to the families of British soldiers who died in Iraq or returned injured; and to "the millions of British citizens who feel our democracy was traduced and undermined by the way in which the decision to go to war was taken on".

In a statement by Alex Salmond released after the inquiry's report was issued, the Scottish National Party said: "After such carnage, people will ask inevitable questions of was conflict inevitable and worthwhile? The answer from Chilcot is undoubtedly no. And who is responsible? The answer is undoubtedly Tony Blair. There must now be a consideration of what political or legal consequences are appropriate for those responsible".

After the inquiry's report was issued, Tony Blair acknowledged that the report made "real and material criticisms of preparation, planning, process and of the relationship with the United States" but cited sections of the report that he said "should lay to rest allegations of bad faith, lies or deceit". He stated: "whether people agree or disagree with my decision to take military action against Saddam Hussein, I took it in good faith and in what I believed to be the best interests of the country. ... I will take full responsibility for any mistakes without exception or excuse. I will at the same time say why, nonetheless, I believe that it was better to remove Saddam Hussein and why I do not believe this is the cause of the terrorism we see today whether in the Middle East or elsewhere in the world".

Following the publication of the report, John Prescott, who was the Deputy Prime Minister at the time of the Iraq War, said that the war was illegal.

The Financial Times reported, 'Every previous inquiry into Britain's decision to invade Iraq has swiftly been condemned by the public as a "whitewash". Such a description hardly applies to the monumental inquest that has been published by Sir John Chilcot. ... After Lord Hutton's report in 2003 and the Butler report the following year, the one thing Sir John could not have afforded to produce was another report that was dismissed as a whitewash.'

=== Deceit criticism ===
Political commentators were split as to what extent the report showed that Tony Blair had lied or deliberately misled Parliament and the public. NBC News said that the report "stops short of saying Blair lied", the chief political commentator for the Financial Times, Philip Stephens, said that Blair's "sin was one of certitude rather than deceit", and writing for Bloomberg View, Eli Lake said that the report proved Blair "didn't lie his way into Iraq". Speaking in Parliament, Corbyn said that MPs who voted for the war were "misled by a small number of leading figures in the Government" who "were none too scrupulous about how they made their case for war", and Caroline Lucas, MP for the Green Party, said that contradictions between public statements and private memos to Bush proved that Blair was "lying" about whether war could have been averted. Philippe Sands said the report pulled its punches but marshalled the factual evidence in such a way that an inference of lying, deceit or manipulation was possible.

== Criticism ==
The timing and nature of the inquiry—and particularly the fact that it would not issue its report until after the 2010 general election—generated political controversy. Conservative Party leader David Cameron dismissed the inquiry as "an establishment stitch-up", and the Liberal Democrats threatened a boycott. In a parliamentary debate over the establishment of the inquiry, MPs from all the major parties criticised the government's selection of its members. MPs drew attention to the absence of anyone with first-hand military expertise, the absence of members with acknowledged or proven inquisitorial skills, and the absence of any elected representatives. Several MPs drew attention to the fact that Chilcot would be unable to receive evidence under oath. Gilbert's appointment to the enquiry was criticised on the basis that he had once compared Bush and Blair to Roosevelt and Churchill.

The criticism by the Liberal Democrats continued with the start of public hearings, with party leader Nick Clegg accusing the government of "suffocating" the inquiry, referring to the power given to government departments to veto sections of the final report. Meanwhile, a group of anti-war protestors staged a demonstration outside the conference centre. Concerns were also raised about the expertise of the panel, particularly with regard to issues of legality by senior judges. On 22 November 2009, former British Ambassador Oliver Miles published an article in the Independent on Sunday, in which he questioned the appointment to the inquiry panel of two British historians on the basis of their previous support for Israel. In a diplomatic cable from the US embassy in London, released as part of Cablegate, Jon Day, director general for security policy at the British Ministry of Defence is cited having promised the US to have "put measures in place to protect your interests" regarding the inquiry. This has been interpreted as an indication that the inquiry is restricted "to minimize embarrassment for the United States."

In 2012, Attorney General Dominic Grieve was criticised when he vetoed the release of documents to the inquiry detailing minutes of Cabinet meetings in the days leading up to the invasion of Iraq in 2003. Concurrently, the Foreign Office successfully appealed against a judge's ruling and blocked the disclosure of extracts of a conversation between Bush and Blair moments before the invasion. In his submission to the inquiry, Philippe Sands observed that:

an independent Dutch Inquiry has recently concluded – unanimously and without ambiguity – that the war was not justified under international law. The Dutch inquiry Committee was presided by W.J.M. Davids, a distinguished former President of the Dutch Supreme Court, and four of its seven members were lawyers. The Dutch Committee was well-placed to address the substantive legal issues. I note, however, that the composition of this Inquiry includes no members with any legal background.

In 2011, the Independent published an article with 15 charges that have yet to be answered by the inquiry. Speaking at a public meeting in 2013, David Owen said that the inquiry "is being prevented from revealing extracts that they believe relevant from exchanges between President Bush and Prime Minister Blair". He blamed Blair and Cameron for this state of affairs, who he believed have entered into a private deal to prevent the publication of important documents out of mutual self-interest. It emerged that the Cabinet Office was resisting the release of "more than 130 records of conversations" between Bush and Blair, as well as "25 notes from Mr Blair to President Bush" and "some 200 cabinet-level discussions".

The report has been criticised for ignoring the role of the UK media. The UK media, "played on the 'hearts and minds' of the British public, constructing a moral case for the Iraq invasion that would convince the general population."

The length of time taken for the inquiry to complete its report is seen by many as excessive, and has been widely criticised.

== See also ==
- Hutton Inquiry
- Iraq Study Group Report
- Senate Report on Iraqi WMD Intelligence
