= 38 Londres Street =

2025 non-fiction book by Philippe Sands

38 Londres Street: On Impunity, Pinochet in England, and a Nazi in Patagonia
- Cover of the book
- Author: Philippe Sands
- Language: English
- Subject: Criminal law
- Genre: Non-fiction
- Publisher: Weidenfeld & Nicolson, Alfred A. Knopf
- Publication date: 2025
- Publication place: United Kingdom
- Pages: 480
- ISBN: 978-1-4746-2074-1

38 Londres Street: On Impunity, Pinochet in England, and a Nazi in Patagonia is a 2025 non-fiction book by Philippe Sands, published by Weidenfeld & Nicolson and Alfred A. Knopf. The book covers the attempted extraditions of Augusto Pinochet and Walther Rauff, and explores connections between the two men. The book is the third in a trilogy on international law, following East West Street (2016) and The Ratline (2021).

== Background ==
Philippe Sands is a British lawyer and scholar, specialising in international law and teaching at University College London and Harvard University. In 1998, he had been invited to join the legal defence team of former Chilean dictator Augusto Pinochet, who was then facing charges of severe human rights violations after being arrested in London on an extradition warrant. After consulting his wife, who, as he tells it, threatened to divorce him if he accepted, Sands turned down the request and instead joined Human Rights Watch in making a submission against Pinochet on the case. His wife, it turned out, had personal connections to Pinochet's case: Chilean dissident Orlando Letelier, who was assassinated by Pinochet's secret police in 1976, had been a friend of her father's and she was a distant cousin of Spanish diplomat Carmelo Soria, also assassinated by DINA in the 1970s. In the 2010s, as Sands conducted research for his books on Nazi war criminals, East West Street (2016) and The Ratline (2021), he came across a letter indicating a potential connection between the cases of Nazi war criminal Walter Rauff and that of Pinochet.

The book is titled after the address of a building in central Santiago used by Pinochet's DINA to torture and disappear dissidents.

== Critical reception ==
Jennifer Szalai of The New York Times praised the book as "marvelous and absorbing," saying that Sands was "a consummate storyteller, gently teasing out his heavy themes and the accompanying legal intricacies through the unforgettable details he unearths and the many people — Rauff’s family, former military conscripts, British legal insiders — who open up to him." Rafael Behr of The Guardian highlighted Sands' "impressive combination of moral clarity and judicious detachment," saying that "it is Sands’s expertise in international law, coupled with a natural storyteller’s intuition for structure, that gives his latest book its understated power." Publishers Weekly gave the book a starred review, describing it as "gripping." Writing in The New York Review of Books, Ariel Dorfman praised the book for "the relentless pursuit of this hidden and repulsive past that gives 38 Londres Street its startling originality, turning it into a tour de force that extends its reach far beyond what we typically envisage from a book about human rights."

Writing in The Law Society Gazette, lawyer Stephen D. Sutton gave the book five stars, saying that "parts of the book read like a spy thriller and in other sections the reader is granted a rare and privileged glimpse into the inner workings of the former House of Lords Appellate Committee." Professor of law at Griffith University Olivera Simic praised Sands for his "strong commitment to neutrality, decency and impartiality" and being "a master of historical non-fiction, he has become known for his unique blend of deeply personal, legal and historical narratives," adding that the book also "offers insight into what it takes to conduct such expansive archival and qualitative research."

Henry Mance of the Financial Times warned that "parts of the book are long-winded," but that "Sands is a storyteller and a scholar, capable of turning scraps into an enthralling collage." Richard Vinen of the Literary Review wrote that the book "mixes history, travel writing and autobiography," warning that "there are many long descriptive passages. It all has a touch of the self-indulgence that one associates with successful barristers," but that "Sands is at his best when he sticks to the central topic and addresses the legal ramifications of the Pinochet case, which are extraordinarily interesting."

Jenni Frazer of The Jewish Chronicle wrote that the book was "at times dense" and that "Sands does not quite succeed in providing a definitive, provable link between Rauff and Pinochet in the carrying out of the executions and torture," but said that it was "particularly fascinating when re-tracing the Pinochet story," while noting Sands involvement in the ICJ case on Israel's occupation of the Palestinian territories, saying that "I imagine that Sands hopes 38 Londres Street might serve as an awful warning to political leaders in places other than Latin America." Writing in The Spectator, Jonathan Sumption, Lord Sumption also found Sands' linkage of Rauff and Pinochet to "not really work" and stated that Sands' claim of a deal between the Chilean and British governments to release Pinochet on health grounds to be "certainly untrue," but that the book was otherwise "extremely accurate."
