= Christopher F Foss =

British historian and writer

Christopher Frank Foss (mostly written Christopher F Foss; born 8 April 1946) is a British military information author. Between 1970 and 2017, he worked for the military information publisher Jane's Information Group as editor of Janes Armour and Artillery, Jane’s Armoured Fighting Vehicles, Jane's AFV System Upgrades and co-editor of other Jane's editions such as Jane’s Artillery and Air Defence and Jane's Military Vehicles and Logistics. After stepping back in late 2017, Foss stayed on as a Consulting Editor with Janes for Jane's Defence Weekly and Jane's International Defence Review until late 2021. Since then he has continued writing articles for other military information publishers such as Shepard Media. During his career at Janes he was responsible for launching Jane’s Defence Review which later spun off into Jane's Soviet Intelligence Review and later Jane's Intelligence Review.

== Life ==
Foss was born in Portsmouth to Frank Victor and Doris (née Dorsett) Foss. Foss attended high school in Portsmouth, England. He has been married to Elaine Jean Jenkins since 1972; they have one child, Robert James. Foss is a member of the Fortress Study Group.

== Bibliography ==
During his career Foss wrote, co-wrote, edited or co-edited, or published approximately 100 books.

=== Author ===
- Jane's Pocket book of modern tanks and armored fighting vehicles. Macdonald & Jane's, London 1974.
- Armoured Fighting Vehicles of the World. Ian Allan, London 1974.
- Artillery of the world. Ian Allan, London 1976. ISBN 978-3-87943-386-5
- Military vehicles of the world. Ian Allan, London 1976.
- The Illustrated Encyclopedia of the World's Tanks and Fighting Vehicles: a technical directory of major combat vehicles from World War 1 to the present day. Salamander Books, London 1977.
- Infantry Weapons of the World. Ian Allan, London 1979.
- Jane's Light Tanks and Armoured Cars. Jane's, London 1984.
- Jane's armored personnel carriers. Jane's 1985.
- Foss, Christopher F (1976). Jane's World Armoured Fighting Vehicles (1st? ed.). London: Jane's Publishing Company. ISBN 0-354-01022-0.
- Foss, Christopher F (1983). Jane's Main Battle Tanks (1st ed.). London: Janes Publishing Company. ISBN 0-7106-0277-4.
- Foss, Christopher F (1986). Jane's Main Battle Tanks (2nd ed.). London: Janes Publishing Company. ISBN 0-7106-0372-X.
- Ray Bonds (Ed.): The Illustrated Dictionary of Modern Weapons: Warplanes, Tanks, Missiles, Warships, Artillery, Small arms. Salamander Books, London c1985.
- Foss, Christopher F (1985). Jane's Armoured Personnel Carriers. London: Jane's Publishing Company. ISBN 0-7106-0354-1.
- Foss, Christopher F (1987). Jane's Armoured Fighting Vehicle Recognition Handbook (1st ed.). London: Jane's Publishing Company. ISBN 0-7106-0432-7.
- The Vickers Tanks. (with Peter McKenzie). Stephens, 1988.
- Jane's AFV recognition handbook. Jane's, Coulsdon 1992.
- Warrior Mechanized Combat Vehicle, 1987–1994 New Vanguard, (with illustrations by Peter Sarson), Osprey, London 1994.
- Scorpion: Reconnaissance Vehicle, 1972–1994 New Vanguard, (with illustrations by Peter Sarson), Osprey, London 1995.
- Jane's modern tanks. HarperCollins, Glasgow 1995.
- Jane's tank & combat vehicle recognition guide. HarperCollins, Glasgow 1996.
- Modern land combat. (with David Miller), Salamander, London 2001. ISBN 978-3-7276-7092-3
- Jane's Tank recognition guide. Collins, London 2006.
- IHS Jane's land Warfare Platforms: Artillery & air Defence. IHS Jane's / IHS Global, Coulsdon 2012–2016.
- IHS Jane's land Warfare Platforms: System upgrades. IHS Janes / IHS Global, Coulsdon 2012–2016.
- IHS Jane's land Warfare Platforms: Armoured fighting vehicles. IHS Jane's / IHS Global, Coulsdon 2012–2016.

=== Editor ===
- Christopher F Foss, Ian Hogg (eds.): Battlefield: The Weapons of Modern land Warfare. Orbis, London 1986.

Janes Armour and Artillery

- Foss, Christopher F, ed. (1979). Jane's Armour and Artillery 1979–80 (1st ed.). London: Jane's Publishing Company. ISBN 0-354-00588-X.
- Foss, Christopher F, ed. (1981). Jane's Armour and Artillery 1981–82 (2nd ed.). London: Jane's Publishing Company. ISBN 0-7106-0727-X.
- Foss, Christopher F, ed. (1982). Jane's Armour and Artillery 1982–83 (3rd ed.). London: Jane's Publishing Company. ISBN 0-7106-0747-4.
- Foss, Christopher F, ed. (1983). Jane's Armour and Artillery 1983–84 (4th ed.). London: Jane's Publishing Company. ISBN 0-7106-0781-4.
- Foss, Christopher F, ed. (1985). Jane's Armour and Artillery 1985–86 (6th ed.). London: Jane's Publishing Company. ISBN 0-7106-0820-9.
- Foss, Christopher F, ed. (2011). Jane's Armour and Artillery 2011–2012 (32nd ed.). Surrey: Janes Information Group. ISBN 978-0-71062-960-9.

Janes Military Vehicles and Logistics

- Foss, Christopher F, ed. (1979). Jane's Combat Support Equipment 1978–79 (1st ed.). London: Macdonald and Jane's Publishers. ISBN 0-354-00571-5.
- Foss, Christopher F, ed. (1981). Jane's Military Vehicles and Ground Support Equipment 1981 (2nd ed.). London: Jane's Publishing Company. ISBN 0-7106-0706-7.
- Foss, Christopher F, ed. (1982). Jane's Military Vehicles and Ground Support Equipment 1982 (3rd ed.). London: Jane's Publishing Company. ISBN 0-7106-0740-7.
- Foss, Christopher F, ed. (1983). Jane's Military Vehicles and Ground Support Equipment 1983 (4th ed.). London: Jane's Publishing Company. ISBN 0-7106-0766-0.
- Foss, Christopher F, ed. (1984). Jane's Military Vehicles and Ground Support Equipment 1984 (5th ed.). London: Jane's Publishing Company. ISBN 0-7106-0794-6.
- Foss, Christopher F, ed. (1994). Jane's Military Vehicles and Logistics 1994–95 (15th ed.). Surrey: Jane's Information Group. ISBN 0-7106-1162-5.

Janes AFV Retrofit Systems

- Tony Cullen and Christopher F Foss. (Ed.): Jane's AFV retrofit systems. Jane's Information Group, Coulsdon 1993.

Janes Land-Based Air Defense

- Foss, Christopher F, ed. (1992). Jane's Land-Based Air Defense. Surrey: Jane's Information Group. ISBN 0710609795.

Janes misc

- Jane's pocket book of towed artillery. Macdonald and Jane's, London 1974.
- An Illustrated guide to World War II tanks and fighting vehicles. Salamander, London c [1981], ISBN 978-0668052320. (Ray Bonds (ed.)
- Modern military trucks. Jane's, London 1981.
- Modern tanks and armored fighting vehicles. Jane's, London 1981.
- The encyclopedia of tanks and armored fighting vehicles: the comprehensive guide to over 900 armored fighting vehicles from 1915 to the present day. Spellmount, Staplehurst 2003, 2002.
