= Bush–Blair 2003 Iraq memo =

Secret US/UK memo relating to Iraq invasion (2003)

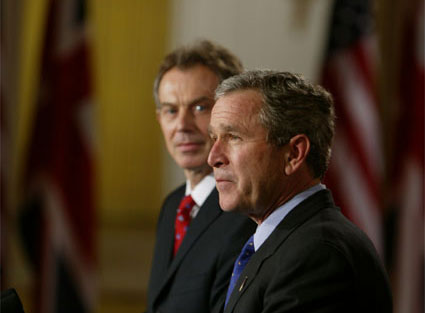
Tony Blair and George W. Bush addressing the media after privately discussing the Iraq War

The Bush–Blair 2003 Iraq memo or Manning memo is a secret memo of a two-hour meeting between American president George W. Bush and British prime minister Tony Blair that took place on 31 January 2003 at the White House. The memo purportedly shows at that point, the administrations of Bush and Blair had already decided that the invasion of Iraq would take place two months later. The memo was written by Blair's chief foreign policy adviser, David Manning, who participated in the meeting.

The memo has become controversial for its content, which includes discussing ways to provoke Saddam Hussein into a confrontation, with Bush floating the idea of painting a U-2 spyplane in United Nations (UN) colors and letting it fly low over Iraq to provoke Iraq into shooting it down, thus providing a pretext for the subsequent invasion.

It also showed Bush and Blair were making a secret deal to carry out the invasion regardless of whether weapons of mass destruction were discovered by UN weapons inspectors, in direct contradiction to statements made by Blair to British Parliament afterwards that Saddam would be given a final chance to disarm.

According to the memo, Bush is paraphrased as saying:

The start date for the military campaign was now pencilled in for 10 March. This was when the bombing would begin.

Five pages long, and classified as extremely sensitive, the existence of the memo was first alleged by Philippe Sands in his book Lawless World (2005). It was then obtained by American newspaper The New York Times, which confirmed its authenticity. After being questioned about the memo at a news briefing, White House Spokesman Scott McClellan stated that he would not comment on private conversations, but said that an invasion was "the last option" and cited Saddam's disinterest in complying with UN mandates.

UK Liberal Democrat party leader Menzies Campbell said, with regard to the memo: "If these allegations are accurate, the Prime Minister and President Bush were determined to go to war with or without a second UN resolution, and Britain was signed up to do so by the end of January 2003."

Media Matters for America described the memo as largely underreported in the media, with some publications declining to run articles on the subject, while the memo received varying degrees of attention on news networks.

== See also ==
- Bush–Aznar memo
- Downing Street memo
- 2004 Iraq document leak
- September Dossier
- Iraq Dossier
- Butler Review
- Iraq Inquiry
- Yellowcake forgery
- Plame affair
- Propaganda
- Operation Rockingham
- Iraqi aluminum tubes
- Wolfowitz Doctrine
