= Faculty of Human, Social, and Political Science, University of Cambridge =

University faculty in England

Coordinates: 52.2036°N 0.1187°E

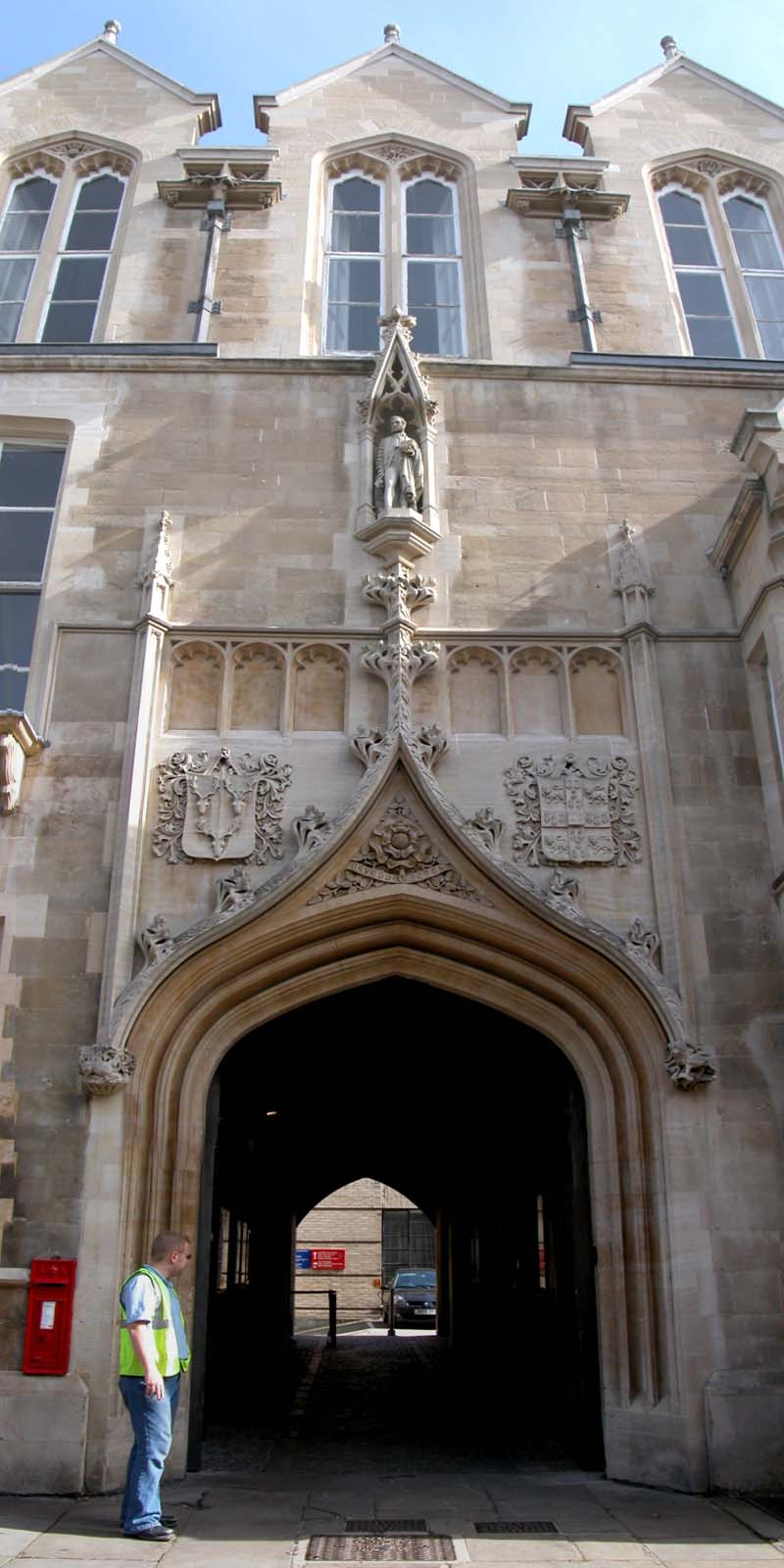
'The SPS archway' at the Old Cavendish Laboratory, Free School Lane

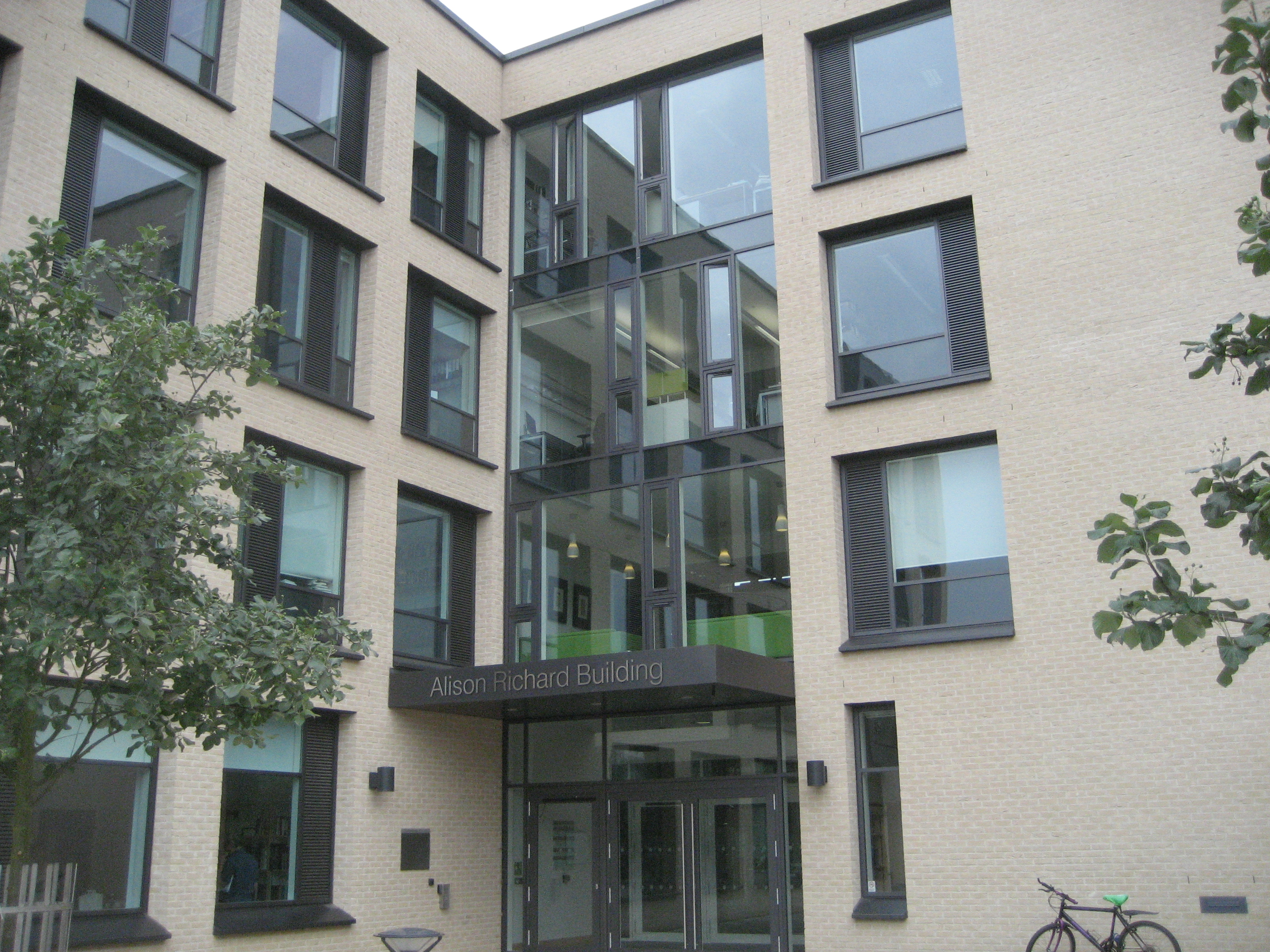
Alison Richard Building

The Faculty of Human, Social, and Political Science at the University of Cambridge was created in 2011 out of a merger of the Faculty of Archaeology and Anthropology and the Faculty of Politics, Psychology, Sociology and International Studies. According to the Cambridge HSPS website: graduates pursue careers in "research (both academic and policy research), the Civil Service (including the Foreign Office), journalism, management consultancy, museums, conservation and heritage management, national and international NGOs and development agencies, the Law, teaching, publishing, health management, and public relations."

The Faculty houses four departments: the Department of Archaeology, the Department of Social Anthropology, the Department of Politics and International Studies and the Department of Sociology.

== Selected members of the Faculty ==
=== University and College Teaching Officers in the HSPS Faculty ===
- Graeme Barker, Professor of Archaeology
- Henrietta Moore, William Wyse Professor of Social Anthropology
- John Thompson, sociology
- Patrick Baert, sociology
- Juliet Mitchell, gender studies
- Glen Rangwala, specialising in Middle East politics
- John Dunn, political theory
- Göran Therborn, social theory
- Sylvana Tomaselli, history
- Ruth Scurr, history

=== Members of the Faculty elsewhere in the University ===
- Gareth Stedman Jones, History (Political Thought)
- Alan Macfarlane, Anthropology
- Quentin Skinner, Christ's College (History of Political Thought)
- William Brown, Economics
- Marilyn Strathern, Anthropology
- Simon Baron-Cohen, Experimental Psychology
- Sandra Dawson, Management Studies (currently Chair of the Faculty Board)

== Applications ==
Colleges in Human, Social, and Political Science include Selwyn, Gonville and Caius, Queens', King's, Sidney Sussex, Corpus Christi and Trinity. Typical offers for the course are A*AA at A Level, or 40–42 points out of 45 with 776 or 777 at Higher Level in the International Baccalaureate.

As of 2008–2009 the MPhil in Social and Developmental Psychology received 66 applications, with 7 starting the course in October 2008. The MPhil in Modern Society and Global Transformations saw 99 applicants, with 26 starting the course in October 2008.

== Notable alumni ==
- Patrick Barkham, journalist
- Kari Blackburn, BBC producer
- Jimmy Carr, comedian
- Jo Cox, former Labour MP for Batley and Spen (deceased)
- Stella Creasy, Labour MP for Walthamstow
- Natalie Evans, Leader of the House of Lords
- Johann Hari, journalist
- Naomie Harris, Academy Award-nominated actress
- Jim Knight, Labour MP and Minister for Schools and Learners
- John Healey, Labour MP and Secretary of State for Defence
- Richard Lander, director of Citywire
- Hugh Laurie, actor
- Gautam Malkani, novelist and Financial Times journalist
- Chris Naylor, CEO of London Borough of Barking and Dagenham
- Richard Osman, television presenter, producer and director
- Helen Oyeyemi, novelist and playwright
- Beth Rigby, political journalist
- Maddy Savage, BBC TV and radio reporter
- Ben Schott, writer and photographer
- Gavin Shuker, former Labour politician
- Galen Strawson, analytic philosopher and literary critic
- Christopher Steele, former British Intelligence officer and author of the Steele Dossier
- Tilda Swinton, Oscar-winning actress
