= Iraqi aluminum tubes =

Dubious evidence used to justify the Iraq War

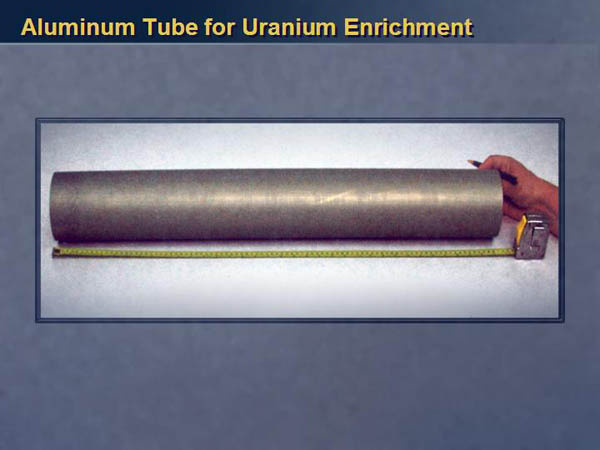
Presentation slide used by U.S. secretary of state Colin Powell at the UN Security Council in the lead up to the 2003 invasion of Iraq

Aluminum tubes purchased by the nation of Iraq were intercepted in Jordan in 2001. In September 2002 they were publicly cited by the White House as evidence that Iraq was actively pursuing an atomic weapon. Prior to the 2003 invasion of Iraq, many questioned the validity of the claim. After the invasion, the Iraq Survey Group determined that the best explanation for the tubes' use was to produce conventional 81-mm rockets; no evidence was found of a program to design or develop an 81-mm aluminum rotor uranium centrifuge.

== The order and shipment ==
In 2000, Iraq ordered, via a company in Jordan, 60,000 high-strength aluminum tubes manufactured from 7075-T6 aluminum with an outer diameter of 81 mm, and an inner diameter of 74.4 mm, a wall thickness of 3.3 mm and a length of 900 mm, to be manufactured in China. These tubes were classified as controlled items by the United Nations and Iraq was not permitted to import them.

The order was placed with an Australian company, International Aluminum Supply (IAS), which was associated with Kam Kiu Propriety Limited, a subsidiary of the Chinese company that would do the manufacturing. Concerned that the tubes might be related to Iraqi efforts to reconstitute its nuclear weapons program, Garry Cordukes, the director of the company, contacted the Australian Secret Intelligence Service (ASIS). In turn, ASIS notified US intelligence services.

ASIS also asked Cordukes to obtain a sample of the tubes for examination. He obtained one and handed it over to the ASIS.

On May 23, 2001, a container load of about 3,000 aluminum tubes left the factory in Guangdong province, southern China. Two days after the shipment left China, Cordukes revealed that Lei, the CEO of Kam Kiu Propriety Limited, had said they received a call from the Chinese government. Then it traveled on a barge to Hong Kong. The Central Intelligence Agency (CIA) was watching its progress, as was the ASIS. In July 2001, the tubes were seized in Jordan by the Jordanian secret police and the CIA, according to a CIA presentation later that year.

Iraq also attempted to acquire aluminum tubes of the same type in late 2002 and early 2003, with negotiations still going on with a Syrian company when the 2003 Invasion of Iraq began.

== Claims made to other governments ==
In late 2001, a small group of agents from the CIA went to Canada, Britain and Australia, to present information to the intelligence agencies and politicians of those countries. The CIA agents said the tubes were destined to become the rotors in a gas centrifuge program to create enriched uranium for nuclear weapons. The CIA agents acknowledged there was another possible use for the tubes – as artillery rocket casings, but argued that the specifications sought by Iraq were far greater than they would need for rockets.

== September 2002 claims ==
On September 8, 2002, Michael R. Gordon and Judith Miller published a story in The New York Times titled "U.S. Says Hussein Intensifies Quest for A-Bomb Parts":

In the last 14 months, Iraq has sought to buy thousands of specially designed aluminum tubes, which American officials believe were intended as components of centrifuges to enrich uranium. American officials said several efforts to arrange the shipment of the aluminum tubes were blocked or intercepted but declined to say, citing the sensitivity of the intelligence, where they came from or how they were stopped. The diameter, thickness and other technical specifications of the aluminum tubes had persuaded American intelligence experts that they were meant for Iraq's nuclear program, officials said, and that the latest attempt to ship the material had taken place in recent months. The attempted purchases are not the only signs of a renewed Iraqi interest in acquiring nuclear arms. President Hussein has met repeatedly in recent months with Iraq's top nuclear scientists and, according to American intelligence, praised their efforts as part of his campaign against the West.

...

Bush administration officials say the quest for thousands of high-strength aluminum tubes is one of several signs that Mr. Hussein is seeking to revamp and accelerate Iraq's nuclear weapons program. Officials say the aluminum tubes were intended as casing for rotors in centrifuges, which are one means of producing highly enriched uranium. The Washington Times reported in July that Iraq sought to acquire stainless steel for centrifuges on one occasion. Officials say that the material sought was special aluminum tubes and that Iraq sought to acquire it over 14 months.

A substantial part of the story was based on deliberate leaking of classified information to the Times reporters by Scooter Libby, the chief of staff of Vice President Dick Cheney. The ombudsman of the New York Times criticized the story after the invasion for one-sidedness and insufficient credibility.

The same day the article appeared in the Times, top officials in the Bush administration appeared on Sunday morning talk shows:

- Cheney, on NBC's Meet the Press, accused Iraq of moving aggressively to develop nuclear weapons over the past 14 months, saying that Iraqi President Saddam Hussein was now "trying, through his illicit procurement network, to acquire the equipment he needs to be able to enrich uranium – specifically, aluminum tubes."
- Secretary of State Colin Powell spoke on Fox News Sunday, saying "And as we saw in reporting just this morning, he is still trying to acquire, for example, some of the specialized aluminum tubing one needs to develop centrifuges that would give you an enrichment capability."
- National Security Advisor Condoleezza Rice said on CNN's Late Edition with Wolf Blitzer that the tubes "are only really suited for nuclear weapons programs, centrifuge programs" and "we don't want the smoking gun to be a mushroom cloud."
- Secretary of Defense Donald Rumsfeld appeared on CBS' Face the Nation.
- Chairman of the Joint Chiefs of Staff Richard Myers appeared on ABC's This Week.

== Internal U.S. Intelligence evaluations ==
=== Central Intelligence Agency ===
In July 2002, in the run up to the 2003 invasion of Iraq, the CIA reported to Congress that "Iraq's efforts to procure tens of thousands of proscribed high-strength aluminum tubes are of significant concern. All intelligence experts agree that Iraq is seeking nuclear weapons and that these tubes could be used in a centrifuge enrichment program. Most intelligence specialists assess this to be the intended use, but some believe that these tubes are probably intended for conventional weapons programs."

In January 2003, the language in the CIA's report to Congress was similar, but provided a bit more detail about conventional weapons: "Iraq's efforts to procure tens of thousands of proscribed high-strength aluminum tubes were of significant concern. All intelligence experts agreed that Iraq remained intent on acquiring nuclear weapons and that these tubes, if modified, could be used in a centrifuge enrichment program. Most intelligence specialists assessed this to be the intended use, but some believed that these tubes were probably intended for use as casings for tactical rockets."

In July 2003, following the March invasion of Iraq, the CIA said in a report to Congress that "We are not yet at the point where we can draw comprehensive or final conclusions about the extent of Iraq's prewar WMD program." It repeated this language in its report in January 2004.

In September 2006, David Corn of The Nation reported that Valerie Plame was involved in CIA work to determine the use of aluminum tubes purchased by Iraq. According to Corn, one of her actions was a trip to Jordan "to work with Jordanian intelligence officials who had intercepted a shipment of aluminum tubes heading to Iraq that CIA analysts were claiming--wrongly--were for a nuclear weapons program. (The analysts rolled over the government's top nuclear experts, who had concluded the tubes were not destined for a nuclear program.)".

=== Department of Energy ===
On September 20, 2002, The United Press International reported that:

... doubts about the quality of some of the evidence that the United States is using to make its case that Iraq is trying to build a nuclear bomb emerged Thursday. While National Security Adviser Condi Rice stated on September 8 that imported aluminum tubes 'are only really suited for nuclear weapons programs, centrifuge programs' a growing number of experts say that the administration has not presented convincing evidence that the tubes were intended for use in uranium enrichment rather than for artillery rocket tubes or other uses. Former U.N. weapons inspector David Albright said he found significant disagreement among scientists within the Department of Energy and other agencies about the certainty of the evidence.

In September 2006, Representative Heather Wilson, a member of the House Intelligence Committee, disclosed that she had learned, in 2002, that the Department of Energy disputed whether those tubes could be used in the centrifuges needed to enrich uranium for bomb fuel. Wilson said that she had questioned CIA officials about the aluminum tubes at classified briefings for members of Congress, prior to the October 11, 2002, vote in Congress to authorize force against Iraq. Wilson told The Albuquerque Tribune that she did not publicly disclose the Energy Department's doubts about the aluminum tubes before Congress voted because the information was classified.

=== October 2002 National Intelligence Estimate ===
In early October 2002, President Bush was given a one-page summary report of a National Intelligence Estimate on the issue of whether Saddam's procurement of high-strength aluminum tubes was for the purpose of developing a nuclear weapon (the NIE was declassified on July 18, 2003, and presented at a White House background briefing on weapons of mass destruction in Iraq.). The report stated that the Department of Energy and the State Department's Bureau of Intelligence and Research believed that the tubes were "intended for conventional weapons," while other intelligence agencies, including some at the CIA, believed that the tubes were intended for nuclear enrichment.

== French intelligence assessments ==
A June 4, 2003, article in the Financial Times reported that "French intelligence had seized a separate shipment of tubes to the US, and tested their tolerance by spinning them to 98,000 revolutions per minute, concluding they were too sophisticated to have alternative uses." The Times also reported that Secretary of State Colin Powell was denied permission by French political authorities from using this information in his February 5, 2003, speech before the U.N. Security Council.

In a speech before the New America Foundation American Strategy Program Policy Forum on October 19, 2005, Colonel Lawrence Wilkerson (Ret.), a former Chief of Staff for the State Department from 2002 to 2005, commented on this. According to Wilkerson, "The French came in the middle of my deliberations at the CIA and said, we have just spun aluminum tubes, and by God, we did it to this RPM, et cetera, et cetera, and it was all, you know, proof positive that the aluminum tubes were not for mortar casings or artillery casings, they were for centrifuges. Otherwise, why would you have such exquisite instruments? We were wrong. We were wrong."

== President Bush's State of the Union address ==
In his January 28, 2003, State of the Union address, Bush stated: "The British government has learned that Saddam Hussein recently sought significant quantities of uranium from Africa. Our intelligence sources tell us that he has attempted to purchase high-strength aluminum tubes suitable for nuclear weapons production."

== Summer 2003 concerns ==
In the summer of 2003, an informal review of classified government records by Deputy National Security Adviser Stephen Hadley concluded that Bush had been directly and repeatedly apprised of the deep rift within the intelligence community over whether Iraq wanted the high-strength aluminum tubes for a nuclear weapons program or for conventional weapons.

According to the March 30, 2006, National Journal article that reported on this review, Hadley was most concerned about the October 2002 one-page summary of a National Intelligence Estimate prepared specifically for President Bush. The review by Hadley was to be part of a damage-control effort launched after former ambassador Joseph C. Wilson IV alleged that Bush's claims regarding uranium purchases were not true. After the review was completed, Karl Rove, President Bush's chief political adviser, allegedly cautioned other White House aides that Bush's 2004 re-election prospects would be severely damaged if it was publicly disclosed that he had been personally warned that a key rationale for going to war had been challenged within the administration.

== See also ==
- September Dossier
- Iraq Dossier
- Butler Review
- Iraq Inquiry
- Yellow rain
- Yellowcake forgery
- Downing Street Memo
- Plame affair
- Propaganda
- Dr. David Kelly
- Operation Rockingham
- Hussein Kamel al-Majid and his Testimony for UNSCOM 8-22-1995.
- Bush-Blair memo
- Bush–Aznar memo
- Casus belli
- False Flag
