= Ratline =

Ratlines are climbing aids in rigging of sailing vessels similar to a rope ladder.

Ratline or ratlines may also refer to:

- Ratlines (World War II), escape routes for Nazi fugitives
- The Ratline, a 2020 book by Philippe Sands
- Ratline, an ordeal practiced at the Virginia Military Institute
