= Ibrahim al-Marashi =

Professor of history involved in Dodgy Dossier affair

- إبراهيم المرعشي
- Born: Baltimore, Maryland
- Known for: Dodgy Dossier

Academic background
- Education: St Antony's College, Oxford (Ph.d); Georgetown University (M.A.); University of California Los Angeles (B.A.)
- Thesis: The Nineteenth Province: The Invasion of Kuwait and the 1991 Gulf War from the Perspective of the Iraqi State (2004)

Ibrahim al-Marashi (Arabic:إبراهيم المراشي) is an associate professor at California State University, San Marcos, researching modern Iraqi history. He is an invited lecturer at the Department of Political Science and International Relations at University of San Diego, the School of Public Health at San Diego State University, and the Department of Visual Arts at University of California San Diego. Prior to this, he was a research associate at the James Martin Center for Nonproliferation Studies (CNS), of the Monterey Institute of International Studies. He is also one of the first professors of IE University in Segovia, being a founding member of the IE Segovia faculty.

Marashi was the author of an article which was plagiarized by the British government and reproduced by MI6 in a 2003 briefing document entitled Iraq: Its Infrastructure of Concealment, Deception and Intimidation (see Dodgy Dossier) which was subsequently used by Colin Powell to justify the Invasion of Iraq.

== Early life ==
Marashi is a second-generation American, who was born in Baltimore, Maryland, spent five years in the UAE, but spent most of his childhood being raised in the city of Monterey, California. His paternal grandfather, Sayyid Hassan al-Marashi, originated from Ottoman Iraq and took part in the 1920 Iraqi revolt against British rule following the First World War. After the suppression of the uprising, he fled Najaf and resettled in Zanzibar.

Marashi's parents were both immigrants to the United States from the Middle East. His mother, Dr. Sabah Al-Marashi, was of mixed Iraqi and Lebanese heritage, and his father, Dr. Murtadha Al-Marashi, was born in Zanzibar. His father migrated to Iraq in the 60's to attend medical school in Baghdad, and would often visit his relatives in Najaf. But when Saddam Hussein rose to power in the 1970's, Marashi's father left, and did not return to Iraq during Hussein's entire tenure in office. Both of Marashi's parents were physicians who emigrated to the United States during the 1960s and 1970s, part of the wider "brain drain" movement in which professionals from the Middle East and other regions sought opportunities abroad. His mother was a diabetes specialist, and his father was a neurologist.

Growing up in the United States, Marashi was a senior in high school during the Iraqi invasion of Kuwait. Marashi was encouraged by his parents to pursue careers in medicine, engineering, or law, but he chose instead to study history. Marashi earned a bachelor's degree in 1995 in Middle Eastern history from the University of California at Los Angeles.

After graduating from UCLA, Marashi desired to enter into the political landscape of Washington, D.C.. He lived in that city for two years while earning his master's degree in political science from Georgetown University, obtaining the degree in 1997. He came to not enjoy the city or its political atmosphere, opting for service in the Middle East.

At some point, for a brief time, he worked with the Center for Middle Eastern Studies at Harvard University, where it was his job to classify captured Iraqi state documents. He also worked as a researcher on Iran-Iraq affairs at the Department of State, where he was stationed at the US Consulate in Jeddah for some time. He also worked as a researcher for the Congressional Research Service and National Defense University.

In 2002, Marashi accepted a research associate position at the Center for Nonproliferation Studies, a research center at the Monterey Institute of International Studies (before it was acquired by Middlebury College). His duties here focused on the research of CBRN weapons and missile technologies in the Middle East, primarily in Iraq and Iran. While living in Monterey during this time, he also became a lecturer at the Naval Postgraduate School.

== Marashi and the Dodgy Dossier affair ==
On January 30, 2003, the British government released a dossier titled Iraq – Its Infrastructure of Concealment, Deception and Intimidation, intended to demonstrate the strength and secrecy of Saddam Hussein's intelligence apparatus. This document was a follow-up to the earlier September Dossier, both of which concerned Iraq and weapons of mass destruction and were ultimately used by the government to justify its involvement in the 2003 Invasion of Iraq. The report was endorsed by Secretary of State Colin Powell during his address to the United Nations Security Council on 5 February 2003 as an example of detailed British intelligence analysis.

Soon after its publication, however, it became evident that the dossier drew heavily from previously published academic and journalistic sources. On February 6, Channel 4 News aired a news segment covering the plagiarism of the articles. Of the MI6 document, pages 6 through 19 were entirely plagiarized from Marashi. Large portions were copied verbatim from an article by Marashi.

As the journalist Jill Lawless wrote for the Associated Press in 2003:

"Passages of several paragraphs are identical in the two documents, others contain very minor alterations. Passages of several paragraphs are identical in the two documents, others contain very minor alterations." (This sentence indeed repeats itself in the printed newspaper article).

His original article, published in the Middle East Review of International Affairs (MERIA) in September 2002, analyzed the structure and operations of Iraq's intelligence and security agencies. The name of Marashi's original article was: Iraq's Security & Intelligence Network: A Guide & Analysis. Marashi's study had been based on Iraqi documents captured during the Gulf War, making the material more than a decade old at the time – Marashi acknowledged the date of his own source material, but MI6 did not acknowledge the discrepancy in theirs. Marashi himself noted that his work was a historical study of Iraqi intelligence practices during the occupation of Kuwait and was never intended to serve as evidence of Iraq's capabilities in 2003. The uncredited use of his research led to widespread criticism, since the government presented it as up-to-date intelligence rather than an academic reconstruction of past events.

The dossier also plagiarized from articles in Jane's Intelligence Review, which were edited in ways that critics argued exaggerated the threat posed by Saddam Hussein's security services. The controversy became widely known in the press as the "dodgy dossier," and it damaged the credibility of the British government's case for war. For al-Marashi, the episode brought unexpected international attention, as his scholarly work on Iraqi intelligence was at the center of a political and diplomatic dispute about the quality and presentation of evidence used to justify the 2003 invasion of Iraq.

Tony Blair's office ultimately apologized to Marashi for its actions, but not to the MERIA journal.

== Academic career after the Dodgy Dossier ==
In 2004, Marashi obtained his Doctor of Philosophy from Saint Anthony's College at the University of Oxford. Marashi then was given a professorial appointment as a visiting professor in Istanbul, at Sabancı University, where he initially intended to remain permanently before later relocating elsewhere.

Throughout his time in Turkey, Marashi had to contend with questions about his supposed role in the Iraq War. His arrival coincided with renewed publicity over the plagiarism of his earlier research by the British government in its 2003 Iraq dossier. Turkish newspapers ran articles linking him to the justification for the Iraq War, with some headlines suggesting he had been the "mastermind" behind the invasion. The attention quickly turned negative: Marashi recalled facing questions from strangers, such as taxi drivers and street vendors, about why he had supposedly started the war.

At the university where he had just begun teaching, student protests were organized against his presence, with some demonstrators labeling him the "architect of the Iraq War." The situation made it difficult for him to continue his career in Turkey, despite his original plan to settle there permanently. He left Sabanci in 2006. He taught in Turkey for some time after, part of that time at Galatasaray University and part of it at Boğaziçi University.

For a brief time in 2008, he became a visiting professor at the Annenberg School for Communication at the University of Pennsylvania. While teaching here, he was informed by his U-Penn colleague Monroe Price that a new branch of IE University was being built in Segovia, Spain, and that they were looking for new professors. Price knew the Dean of the college, and encouraged Marashi to apply.

In 2008, he accepted a position at the newly established IE University in Segovia, and at the main campus in Madrid, Spain, relocating there to continue his academic work. He taught in Spain until 2011.

In 2011, Marashi returned to the United States, where he accepted a position on the faculty of California State University at San Marcos.

His position as research associate for the Center for Nonproliferation Studies in Monterey had been maintained through the years, and upon his return to California, he also taught advanced seminars there in media and terrorism in the Middle East, but he left CNS in 2013.

== Written works ==
=== Books ===
- The Nineteenth Province: Saddam Hussein's Strategy during the Occupation of Kuwait and the 1991 Gulf War(Manuscript proposal passed review process with Cambridge University Press)
- With Arthur Goldschmidt, A Concise History of the Middle East, 13th edition (Routledge, forthcoming 2024)
- With Phebe Marr, The Modern History of Iraq, 4th edition (Routledge, 2017)
- With Sammy Salama, Iraq's Armed Forces: An Analytical History (Routledge, 2008) and in
- Arabic (Oma Publishing House, 2018)
- With Alexander Grey, Peace and Conflict: Europe and Beyond (University of Deusto Press, 2006)

=== Journal articles ===
- "Islamic State's Necropolitical Regime of the Jazira: The Necropraxy of Destroying the Necropolis," Rivista degli Studi Orientali, (forthcoming)
- With Amar Causevic, "NATO and Anthropogenic Strategic Security," Connections: The Quarterly Journal, vol. 22, no. 1 (2023): 67-78
- "Iraq's Popular Mobilisation Units: Intra-Sectarian Rivalry and Arab Shi'a Mobilisation from the 2003 Invasion to the Covid-19 Pandemic," International Politics, vol. 60, 2023, pp. 194–213
- "Demobilization minus Disarmament and Reintegration: Iraq's Security Sector from the US Occupation to the Covid-19 Pandemic," Journal of Intervention and Statebuilding, vol. 15, no. 4, 2021, pp. 441–458
- "Baghdad in the Middle: Iraq's Negotiation of its Constrained Sovereignty during the Trump Presidency," Journal of South Asian and Middle Eastern Studies, vol. 44, no. 2, Winter 2021, pp. 1–18
- With Amar Causevic, "NATO and Collective Environmental Security in the Middle East and North Africa: From the Cold War to Covid-19," Journal of Strategic Security, vol. 13, no. 4, Fall 2020, pp. 28–41
- With Amar Causevic, "Can NATO Evolve into A Climate Alliance Treaty Organization in The Middle East?" The Bulletin of Atomic Scientists, vol. 76, no. 2, March 2020
- "The 2003 Iraq War Did Not Take Place: A First-Person Perspective on Intelligence and Iraq's WMD Program," International Journal of Baudrillard Studies, vol. 11, no. 2, Spring 2014
- "Iraq's Gulf Policy and Regime Security from the Monarchy to the post-Baathist Era," British Journal of Middle Eastern Studies, vol. 36, no. 3, Fall 2009, pp. 449–461
- With Aysegul Keskin, "Reconciliation Dilemmas in post-Baathist Iraq: Truth Commissions, Media and Ethno-sectarian Conflicts," Mediterranean Politics, vol. 13, no. 2, Summer 2008, pp. 243–259
- "The Dynamics of Iraq's Media: Ethno-Sectarian Violence, Political Islam, Public Advocacy, and Globalization," Cardozo Arts and Entertainment Law Journal, vol. 25, no. 95, Summer 2007, pp. 96–140
- "Constructing the Myth of the Shia Arc: From the Iranian Revolution to the 2003 Iraq War," Eurasia Dossier, vol. 13, no. 3, 2007, pp. 1–37 (in Turkish)
- "The 'Dodgy Dossier:' The Academic Implications of the British Government's Plagiarism Incident," The Middle East Studies Association Bulletin, vol. 40, Summer 2006, pp. 33–44
- "Middle Eastern Perceptions of US-Turkey Relations after the 2003 War," Turkish Policy Quarterly, vol. 4, no. 1, Spring 2005, pp. 123–136
- "A New Chapter in Iraqi-Turkish Relations?: Examining the Iraqi and Arab Reactions to the Proposed Turkish Deployment to Iraq," Insight Turkey, vol. 6, no. 1, Winter 2004, pp. 119–128
- "Iraq's Hostage Crisis: Kidnappings, Hostages and the Mass Media," Middle East Review of International Affairs, vol. 8, no. 4, December 2004, pp. 1–11
- "Saddam's Security Apparatus during the Invasion of Kuwait and the Kuwaiti Resistance," The Journal of Intelligence History, vol. 4, no. 2, Winter 2003, pp. 61–86
- "The Mindset of Iraq's Security Apparatus," Journal of Intelligence and National Security, vol. 18, no. 3, Fall 2003, pp. 1–23
- "The Clan, Tribal and Family Network of Saddam's Intelligence Apparatus," International Journal of Intelligence and Counter Intelligence, vol. 16, no. 2, Summer 2003, pp. 202–211
- "Iraq's Security and Intelligence Network: A Guide and Analysis," Middle East Review of
- International Affairs, vol. 6, no. 3, Fall 2002, pp. 1–13

== See also ==
- David Kelly
- Alastair Campbell
- Iraq Dossier
