= Glen Rangwala =

British political scientist

Glen Rangwala is a University Lecturer and fellow of Trinity College, Cambridge University in England. Trained in political theory and international law, he completed a doctorate on political and legal rhetoric in the Arab Middle East. His academic work focuses on Palestinian politics from 1967 to 1977, and the rhetorical relations between the West Bank resident population and the leadership of the Palestinian resistance movement in exile. He has co-written a monograph, Iraq in Fragments (Cornell University Press, 2006), on the fragmentation of the Iraqi polity following the invasion of 2003. He has also published on international humanitarian law, comparative human rights law, Iraq and nuclear weapons. He is a member of the Labour Party and an editor of Labour Briefing.

He is involved with Campaign Against Sanctions on Iraq (dissolved and replaced by Cambridge Solidarity with Iraq in October 2003) and Arab Media Watch. In the run-up to the 2003 Iraq war Rangwala wrote articles in newspapers and appeared on British TV, especially in the context of the "dodgy dossier" prepared by Tony Blair's government. Rangwala had discovered that this dossier was mostly plagiarised from a postgraduate student's thesis and articles in Jane's Intelligence Review (with minor falsifications) and traced back the people who had edited the dossier . He submitted written evidence to the House of Commons Select Committee on Foreign Affairs when it investigated the British government's information policy leading to the Iraq war . He has since published a number of articles on the Iraq war, especially in The Independent .

Together with Dan Plesch, he contributed an article to A Case to Answer, a report commissioned by MP Adam Price on which impeachment procedures against Tony Blair are based. The report assembles evidence that Blair misled the British Parliament and people over reasons for the 2003 war on Iraq mainly from the PM's own statements and evidence disclosed by the Hutton Inquiry and the Butler Report.
