= Lawless World =

Book by Philippe Sands

Lawless World: America and the Making and Breaking of Global Rules
- Author: Philippe Sands
- Language: English
- Genre: Non-fiction
- Publisher: Viking Adult
- Publication date: October 2005
- ISBN: 0-670-03452-5

Lawless World: America and the Making and Breaking of Global Rules (ISBN 0-670-03452-5) is a book by the British lawyer and author, Philippe Sands. It was first published by Viking Adult in October 2005.

Among other issues, the book discusses the creation of the International Criminal Court and the Kyoto Protocol. The book seeks to document how the United States is abandoning international law. One of the book’s most controversial revelations is the inclusion of Bush-Blair memo, which details private discussions between U.S. President George W. Bush and U.K. Prime Minister Tony Blair about the Iraq War. This disclosure stirred intense debate in both Britain and the United States, as it shed light on the behind-the-scenes planning and raised questions about the legality of the war.

BBC World Service wrote "Downing Street has refused to comment on the authenticity of the source material for the book".
