= Iraq Dossier =

2003 briefing document for UK prime minister Tony Blair

Iraq – Its Infrastructure of Concealment, Deception and Intimidation (more commonly known as the Iraq Dossier, the February Dossier or the Dodgy Dossier) was a 2003 briefing document for the British prime minister Tony Blair's Labour Party government. It was issued to journalists on 3 February 2003 by Alastair Campbell, Blair's Director of Communications and Strategy, and concerned Iraq and weapons of mass destruction. Along with the earlier September Dossier, these documents were ultimately used by the British government to justify its involvement in the invasion of Iraq in 2003.

== Dossier ==
The term Dodgy Dossier was first coined by online polemical magazine Spiked in relation to the September Dossier. The term was later employed by Channel 4 News when its reporter, Julian Rush, was made aware of Glen Rangwala's discovery that much of the work in the Iraq Dossier had been plagiarised from various unattributed sources including a thesis produced by a student at California State University. The most notable source was an article by then graduate student Ibrahim al-Marashi, entitled Iraq's Security and Intelligence Network: A Guide and Analysis. When the Dossier was released, al-Marashi was working as a research associate at the Center for Nonproliferation Studies (CNS), a research center of the Monterey Institute of International Studies.

Whole sections of Marashi's writings on "Saddam's Special Security Organisation" were repeated verbatim including typographical errors, while certain amendments were made to strengthen the tone of the alleged findings (e.g., "monitoring foreign embassies in Iraq" became "spying on foreign embassies in Iraq", and "aiding opposition groups in hostile regimes" became "supporting terrorist organisations in hostile regimes").

In its opening paragraph the briefing document claimed that it drew "upon a number of sources, including intelligence material". Before the document's release it had been praised by Tony Blair and United States Secretary of State Colin Powell as further intelligence and quality research. The day after Channel 4's exposé, Blair's office issued a statement admitting that a mistake was made in not crediting its sources, but did not concede that the quality of the document's text was affected.

The claims contained in the September and 'Iraq' Dossiers were called into question when weapons of mass destruction (WMD) were not found in Iraq, and the dossiers were encompassed by House of Commons Foreign Affairs Select Committee inquiry. The Committee subsequently reported that the sources should have been credited, and that the dossier should have been checked by ministers before being released. The dossier had only been reviewed by a group of civil servants operating under Alastair Campbell. The committee stated that the publication was "almost wholly counter-productive" and in the event only served to undermine the credibility of the government's case.

The controversy over the Iraq Dossier was mentioned frequently in the government's conflict with the BBC over the claim in the September Dossier that Iraq could deploy biological weapons within 45 minutes of an order to do so, and the controversy surrounding the death of Dr. David Kelly. Andrew Gilligan, the BBC journalist who wrote a report which claimed that the September Dossier had been deliberately exaggerated, stated before the Hutton Inquiry that recalling the February Dossier had led him to file his report based on his interview with Dr. Kelly without seeking confirmation from other sources. Whether or not the September Dossier was inconsistent with the original intelligence, it was altered in ways that made it inconsistent with itself.

The dossier became a point of amusement in British politics. During one Prime Minister's Questions, Michael Howard (then leader of the Opposition), informed Blair, "I have got a great big dossier on his past and I haven't even had to sex it up." The term "Dodgy Dossier" was used again in January 2017, in reference to the "Steele dossier" on a supposed sex scandal involving US President Donald Trump.

== See also ==
- British parliamentary approval for the invasion of Iraq
- Bush–Blair 2003 Iraq memo
- Butler Review
- David Kelly (weapons expert)
- Downing Street memo
- Hussein Kamel al-Majid
- Hutton Inquiry
- Iraq Inquiry
- Iraqi aluminum tubes
- Niger uranium forgeries
- Operation Rockingham
- Plame affair
- Propaganda
- September Dossier
- Steele dossier
