= Jane's International Defence Review =

Jane's International Defence Review (IDR) was a monthly magazine reporting on military news and technology.

== History and profile ==
International Defense Review was established in 1968. It was published by Interavia SA (Geneva, Switzerland) until it was acquired by Jane's Publishing Group in 1987. According to one entry in WorldCat, the name of the magazine was International Defense Review, but another WorldCat entry states that the name was International Defence Review from 1968 until 1995. Yet another WorldCat entry states that the title is IHS Jane's International Defence Review after 2012.

The IDR is one of a number of military-related publications named after Fred T. Jane, an Englishman who first published Jane's All the World's Fighting Ships in 1898. It is a unit of Jane's Information Group, which was acquired by IHS Inc. in 2007.

The magazine provides in-depth coverage and analysis of air, land and sea platforms and systems, and regularly features articles on equipment upgrade programmes, strategic and security issues, military doctrine, electronics and computing, operations and training and foreign affairs. It is widely considered to be a reputable source of public domain information regarding defence systems and military and industry news.

The last edition of IDR was published in December 2021. It and Jane's Intelligence Review were replaced by Janes Defence and Intelligence Review.
