= Philippe Sands =

British/French lawyer, legal academic and author (born 1960)

Philippe Sands KC
- Born: Philippe Joseph Sands; 17 October 1960 (age 66); London, England
- Education: University College School, Corpus Christi College, Cambridge
- Occupations: Barrister, author
- Notable work: Lawless World: America and the Making and Breaking of Global Rules (2005) Torture Team: Rumsfeld's Memo and the Betrayal of American Values (2008) East West Street: On the Origins of Genocide and Crimes against Humanity (2016) The Last Colony: A Tale of Exile, Justice and Britain's Colonial Legacy (2022)

Philippe Joseph Sands KC FRSL (born 17 October 1960) is a British and French writer and lawyer at 11 King's Bench Walk and Professor of Laws and Director of the Centre on International Courts and Tribunals at the Faculty of Laws, University College London. A specialist in international law, he appears as counsel and advocate before many international courts and tribunals, including the International Court of Justice, the International Tribunal for the Law of the Sea, the European Court of Justice, the European Court of Human Rights and the International Criminal Court.

Sands has served on the panel of arbitrators at the International Centre for the Settlement of Investment Disputes (ICSID) and the Court of Arbitration for Sport (CAS).

He is the author of seventeen books on international law, including Lawless World (2005) and Torture Team (2008). His 2016 book East West Street: On the Origins of Genocide and Crimes against Humanity has received numerous prizes, including the 2016 Baillie Gifford Prize for Non-Fiction, and has been translated into 24 languages. His latest books are The Ratline: Love, Lies and Justice on the Trail of a Nazi Fugitive (2020) about Otto Wächter, The Last Colony: A Tale of Exile, Justice and Britain's Colonial Legacy (2022) about Chagos and the life of Liseby Elysé and 38 Londres Street: On Pinochet in London and a Nazi in Patagonia (2025).

Sands served as President of English PEN from February 2018 to April 2023 and was a member of the Board of the Hay Festival of Arts and Literature from 2018 to December 2024.

== Early life ==
Sands was born in London on 17 October 1960 to Jewish parents; his mother (née Buchholz) was French. He was educated at University College School in Hampstead, London, and read law at Corpus Christi College, Cambridge, attaining a BA degree in 1982 and achieving first-class honours in the LLM course a year later. After completing his postgraduate studies at Cambridge, Sands spent a year as a visiting scholar at Harvard Law School.

== Academic career ==
From 1984 to 1988, Sands was a Research Fellow at St Catharine's College, Cambridge, and the Cambridge University Research Centre for International Law (now the Lauterpacht Centre for International Law). He has also held academic positions at King's College London (1988–1993) and SOAS (1993–2001). He was a Global Professor of Law at New York University Law School (1993–2003) and has held visiting positions at Paris I (Sorbonne), University of Melbourne, the Graduate Institute of International and Development Studies, Indiana University Bloomington, University of Toronto, Boston College Law School and Lviv University.

In 2019, he was appointed the Samuel and Judith Pisar Visiting Professor of Law at Harvard Law School.

Sands co-founded the Centre for International Environmental Law (1989) and the Project on International Courts and Tribunals (1997).

== Legal career ==
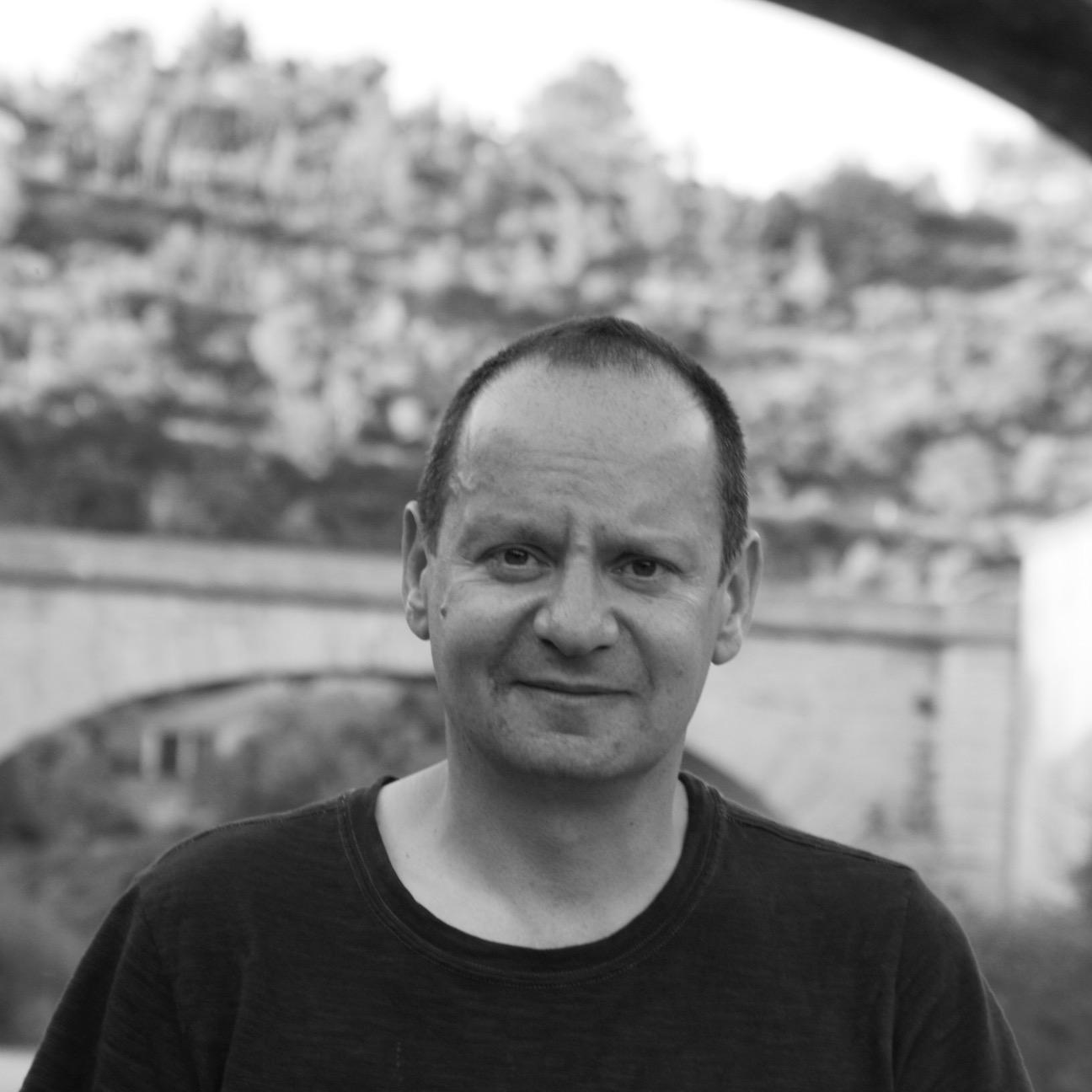
Sands in 2016

Sands was called to the Bar of England and Wales in 1985. He was a founding member of Matrix Chambers in 2000 and was appointed Queen's Counsel (QC) in 2003. Sands was elected a Bencher of Middle Temple in 2009. He joined 11 King's Bench Walk on 1 October 2022.

Sands has acted as counsel and advocate in cases that span a wide range of subject areas, including:

- maritime boundary disputes (in the Caribbean, Atlantic and Pacific Oceans);
- claims relating to natural resources, pollution and environmental assessment;
- international trade disputes;
- issues relating to the immunity of serving and former heads of state from the jurisdiction of national and international courts;
- claims under the United Nations Convention on the Law of the Sea;
- claims relating to the use of force, allegations of torture, genocide, self-determination and other violations of human rights;
- claims relating to violations of international criminal law.

Sands has acted as counsel in more than two dozen cases at the International Court of Justice, including the Nuclear Weapons Advisory Opinion (counsel for the Solomon Islands); the Georgia v. Russia dispute (counsel for Georgia); Whaling in the Antarctic (counsel for Australia); Legal Consequences of the Separation of the Chagos Archipelago from Mauritius in 1965; and Application of the Genocide Convention on the Prevention and Punishment of the Crime of Genocide (counsel for The Gambia). He has also been instructed in inter-State arbitrations, including the Chagos Marine Protected Area Arbitration (counsel for Mauritius) and the dispute between the Philippines and China over maritime jurisdiction in the South China Sea (counsel for the Philippines).

Before accepting appointments as ICSID arbitrator (since 2007), Sands acted as counsel in ICSID and other investment cases (including Tradex, Waste Management and Vivendi). He now sits as arbitrator in investment disputes and in sports disputes (CAS).

In 2005, Sands' book Lawless World catalysed legal and public debate in the UK on the legality of the 2003 Iraq War. The book addresses a range of topics, including the Pinochet trial in London, the creation of the International Criminal Court, the war on terror and the establishment of the detention camp at Guantánamo Bay. In the second edition of Lawless World (2006) Sands revealed that UK Prime Minister Tony Blair had told US President George W. Bush that he would support US plans to invade Iraq before he had sought legal advice about the invasion's legality. Sands exposed a memorandum dated 31 January 2003 that described a two-hour meeting between Blair and Bush, during which Bush discussed the possibility of luring Saddam Hussein's forces to shoot down a Lockheed U-2 reconnaissance aircraft, an act that would cause Iraq to be in breach of UN Security Council Resolutions.

The memo disclosed that Blair told Bush that he would support US plans to go to war in the absence of a second UN Security Council Resolution, apparently contradicting an assurance Blair gave in the UK Parliament on 25 February 2003. Sands has maintained that there was no basis in international law for military action in Iraq.

Sands' 2008 book Torture Team sets out in detail the role of senior lawyers in the Bush administration in authorising torture (including so-called 'enhanced interrogation techniques' at Guantánamo Bay). As a result of his work on Torture Team, Sands was invited to give oral and written evidence to the UK and Dutch Parliaments, as well as to the US House of Representatives and the US Senate:

- UK House of Commons Select Committee on Foreign Affairs (1 June 2004)
- UK House of Commons Select Committee on Foreign Affairs (April 2006)
- US House of Representative Committee on the Judiciary (6 May 2008)
- US Senate Committee on the Judiciary (19 June 2008)
- Dutch Parliamentary Inquiry: Davids Commission (September 2009)

In 2009, Jane Mayer reported in The New Yorker on Sands' reaction to news that Spanish jurist Baltazar Garzon had received motions requesting that six former Bush officials be charged with war crimes.

From 2010 to 2012, Sands served as a Commissioner on the UK Government Commission on a Bill of Human Rights. The commission's Report was published in December 2012. Sands and Baroness Kennedy disagreed with the majority, and their dissent ("In Defence of Rights") was published in the London Review of Books.

Sands and Kennedy expressed concern that support for a UK Bill of Rights was motivated by a desire for the UK to withdraw from the European Convention of Human Rights. In May 2015, Sands wrote in The Guardian that plans for a British Bill of Rights could leave some people in the UK with more rights than others and that this would be "inconsistent with the very notion of fundamental human rights, in which every human being has basic minimum rights."

On 17 September 2015, Sands gave a public lecture at the UK Supreme Court titled "Climate Change and the Rule of Law: Adjudicating the Future in International Law". He expressed the view that a ruling by an international judicial body, such as the International Court of Justice, could help resolve the scientific dispute on climate change and be authoritative and legally dispositive.

In December 2015, Sands (and two colleagues at Matrix Chambers) drafted a Legal Opinion on the legality of UK arms sales to Saudi Arabia for Amnesty International, Oxfam and Saferworld. The Opinion concluded that by authorising the transfer of weapons to Saudi Arabia, the UK government was acting in breach of its obligations under the Arms Trade Treaty, the EU Common Position on Arms Exports and the UK's Consolidated Criteria on Arms Exports.

On 16 April 2018, Sands co-authored a piece in The Times that argued that the UK had no established legal basis for the 2018 missile strikes against Syria.

In November 2020, a panel of international lawyers chaired by Sands and Florence Mumba started drafting a proposed law criminalising ecocide, the destruction of ecosystems. The law could be in force within five years, he told the Financial Times in July 2021.

In February 2024, Sands argued in favour of the State of Palestine at the International Court of Justice's case on Israel's occupation of the Palestinian territories. He said "Palestinian statehood is not dependent on the approval of Israel" and that international law of self-determination required other "UN Member States [to] bring Israel's occupation to an immediate end. No aid. No assistance. No complicity. No contribution to forcible actions. No money, no arms, no trade, no nothing." He also said Israel "has arrogated to itself the right to decide who owns Palestinian land, who may live on it, and how it must be used" and called its support for 700,000 settlers living illegally in the occupied Palestinian territory "demographic manipulation of the highest order". Sands refuted the US and the UK claims that an advisory opinion from the ICJ would hinder future negotiations.

== Writing, theatre and film ==
Sands is a contributor to the Financial Times and The Guardian, and an occasional contributor to the London Review of Books and Vanity Fair. He frequently comments on issues of international law and is a contributor to BBC programmes, Sky News, CNN, Al Jazeera and national radio and TV stations around the world. His written work has formed the basis for four staged productions exploring international law's public and historical impact:

- Called to Account, a staged inquiry into the legal issues surrounding the Iraq War (performed at Tricycle Theatre in April 2007);
- Staged readings of Torture Team (performed at the Tricycle Theatre in 2009, Hay Festival in 2010, and the Long Wharf Theatre in 2011);
- A Song of Good and Evil (performed at the Southbank's Purcell Room on 29–30 November 2014, Stockholm's Berwaldhallen on 14 January 2015, Nuremberg Courtroom 600 at the invitation of the German Government to mark the 70th anniversary of the opening day of the Nuremberg Trials on 21 November 2015, and Montauban's Théâtre Olympe de Gouges on 28 November 2015). It has also been performed at Kings Place in London, and in Australia, Istanbul, Brussels, The Hague and New York.
- The Last Colony (performed in 2022 at the Avignon Festival and the Edinburgh International Book Festival).

Sands' book East West Street: On the Origins of Genocide and Crimes against Humanity (2016) has been translated into 20 languages. It is the basis for David Evans' documentary What Our Fathers Did: A Nazi Legacy, which premiered in April 2015 at the Tribeca Film Festival. It was released in the US on 6 November 2015 and in the UK on 20 November 2015.

Sands wrote the script and appears in the film alongside two sons of prominent Nazi officials, Niklas Frank (son of Hans Frank, the Governor-General of occupied Poland) and Horst von Wächter (son of Otto Wächter, the Governor of Kraków in Poland and Galicia in Ukraine). The documentary, which explores the relationship between the sons and their fathers, won the Yad Vashem Chairman's Award at the Jerusalem Film Festival and was nominated in the Best Documentary category at the Stockholm Film Festival and at the Evening Standard British Film Awards.

In 2018, Sands wrote and presented the BBC Radio 4 documentary Intrigue: The Ratline, about the disappearance of senior Nazi Otto Wächter, investigating the "ratlines" by which he escaped justice. Sands has since published a book on this topic.

In 2001, Sands published an Introduction to Franz Kafka's The Trial.

In 2020, Sands published The Ratline: Love, Lies and Justice on the Trail of a Nazi Fugitive.

In 2022, he published The Last Colony: A Tale of Exile, Justice and Britain's Colonial Legacy about Chagos, where "a secret decision was taken to offer the US a base at Diego Garcia ... create a new colony (the 'British Indian Ocean Territory') and deport the entire local population." As summarised by The Observer: "The Chagossians were forced from their archipelago in the Indian Ocean in the 1970s, and Britain still refuses to hand it back. Human rights lawyer Philippe Sands relates the wider tragedy of the scandal with nerve and precision."

In May 2024, Sands joined the pianist Emanuel Ax, who was born in Lviv, for a performance at the Philharmonie de Paris titled 'Justice, words, music: five moments'. This was part of a series of events in which the Philharmonie invites figures from the artistic world and the world of ideas to take a look at music and to question the meaning of listening in order to approach ethical, political and social questions in a new light.

Sands served for several years on the Board of the Tricycle Theatre. He was President of English PEN from February 2018 to April 2023 (having served on the Board since January 2013). From 2018 to December 2024, he was a member of the Board of the Hay Festival of Arts and Literature, and his interviewees at Hay included Julian Assange (2011); Vanessa Redgrave (2011); Keir Starmer (2013); John le Carré (2013); Lord Justice Leveson (2014) and Tippi Hedren (2016).

== Personal life ==
Sands lives in North London with his wife, Natalia Schiffrin, and three children. She is a daughter of André Schiffrin. In a 2016 interview for The Guardian, he said: "I want to be treated as Philippe Sands individual, not Philippe Sands Brit, Londoner or Jew."

== Bibliography ==
=== General ===
- Lawless World: America and the Making and Breaking of Global Rules (2005; Arabic edition in 2007; Farsi edition in 2008; Chinese edition in 2012; Turkish edition forthcoming in 2016)
- Torture Team: Rumsfeld's Memo and the Betrayal of American Values (2008; French edition in 2009)
- East West Street (2016)
- My Lviv (2016; together with Józef Wittlin's My Lwów, published as City of Lions)
- The Ratline, London: Weidenfeld and Nicolson, 2020.
- La Filière, 10 podcasts, Radio France, France culture, 2021
- The Last Colony: A Tale of Exile, Justice and Britain's Colonial Legacy, London: Weidenfeld and Nicolson, 2022
- 38 Londres Street: On Impunity, Pinochet in England and a Nazi in Patagonia, London: Weidenfeld and Nicolson, 2025

=== Academic ===
- Principles of International Environmental Law (with Jacqueline Peel) (1995, 2003, 2012, 2019)
- International Law and Developing Countries: Essays in Honour of Kamal Hossain (ed. with Sharif Bhuiyan and Nico Schrijver) (2014)
- 2013 introduction to Hersch Lauterpacht. An International Bill of Rights of Man (1945).
- Selecting International Judges: Principle, Process and Politics (with Kate Malleson, Ruth Mackenzie and Penny Martin) (2010)
- The Manual of International Courts and Tribunals (ed. with Ruth Mackenzie, Cesare Romano, Yuval Shany), (2010)
- Bowett's Law of International Institutions (with Pierre Klein) (2001, 2009)
- Justice for Crimes against Humanity (ed. with Mark Lattimer) (2003)
- From Nuremberg to the Hague (ed.) (2003)
- Vers une transformation du droit international: Institutionnaliser le doute (2000)
- Environmental Law, The Economy and Sustainable Development (ed. with Richard Stewart and Richard Revesz) (2000)
- The International Court of Justice and Nuclear Weapons (ed. with Laurence Boisson de Chazournes) (1999)
- Greening International Law (ed.) (1993)
- The Antarctic and the Environment (ed. with Joe Verhoeven and Maxwell Bruce) (1992)
- Chernobyl: Law and Communication (1988)

== Prizes and awards ==
- 1999: Henri Rolin Medal for contribution to international law
- 2005: Elizabeth Haub Prize for contribution to environmental law
- 2015: Honorary Doctorate in law, University of Lincoln
- 2016: Baillie Gifford Prize for East West Street
- 2017: Jewish Quarterly-Wingate Prize for East West Street
- 2017: Honorary Doctorate in Law, University of East Anglia
- 2017: British Book Awards, Non-Fiction Book of the Year
- 2017: Prix du Meilleur Livre Etranger (Sofitel) for East West Street
- 2018: Prix Montaigne for East West Street
- 2018: Prix du Livre Européen for East West Street
- 2019: Honorary Doctorate, University of Leuven
- 2019: Annetje Fels-Kupferschmidt prize
- 2020: Elected Fellow, Royal Society of Literature
- 2021: Grand Commander of the Order of the Star and Key of the Indian Ocean (GCSK)
- 2022: Honorary Doctorate in Law, University of Liège
- 2022: Honorary Doctorate in Theology, University of Lund
- 2022: Honorary Doctorate in Law, University Jean Moulin Lyon 3
- 2022: Academic Honoris Causa, Carta Academica
- 2023: Prix de la Contre-Allée for The Last Colony
- 2023: Honorary Fellow of the British Academy
- 2023: RocaJunyent Law & Society Prize
- 2023: Austrian Book Trade's Honorary Award for Tolerance in Thought and Action
- 2023: Honorary Doctorate, Sheffield Hallam University
- 2024: The George Barrett Award for Public Interest Law
- 2025: Erich Maria Remarque Peace Prize
- 2026: Friedenspreis des Deutschen Buchhandels (Peace Prize of the German Booksellers Association)
