= The Ratline =

2020 book by Philippe Sands

The Ratline: The Exalted Life and Mysterious Death of a Nazi Fugitive
- Author: Philippe Sands
- Language: English
- Subject: Otto Wächter
- Publisher: Weidenfeld & Nicolson
- Publication date: 2020
- Pages: 432
- ISBN: 978-1-4746-0812-1

The Ratline: The Exalted Life and Mysterious Death of a Nazi Fugitive is a 2020 book by Philippe Sands. It examines the life of Nazi politician Otto Wächter, especially the time after World War II until his death in 1949; it also discusses the author's meetings with Wächter's son Horst.

Prior to the publication of the book, the author presented a ten-episode podcast series in 2018 named Intrigue: The Ratline.

== Reviews ==
Writing for The Guardian, Ashish Ghadiali states that "in Sands we have an incomparable guide who finds a kind of redemption on every road of the human experience, though never at the expense of responsibility or truth. The outcome is a feat of exhilarating storytelling – gripping, gratifying and morally robust."

== See also ==
- Ratlines (World War II) – Nazi escape routes
