= East West Street =

2016 book by Philippe Sands

East West Street: On the Origins of Genocide and Crimes Against Humanity
- First US edition
- Author: Philippe Sands
- Publisher: Alfred A. Knopf
- Pages: 425
- ISBN: 978-0-385-35071-6

East West Street: On the Origins of Genocide and Crimes Against Humanity (Note: Published as East West Street: On the Origins of "Genocide" and "Crimes Against Humanity" in the United States.) is a 2016 book by Philippe Sands that examines the lives of two Jewish lawyers, Hersch Lauterpacht and Raphael Lemkin, born within three years of each other and students in the same city on the eastern outskirts of Europe, Lviv, who created the legal concepts of crimes against humanity and genocide. It is a memoir and history of the origins of international criminal law in the aftermath of the Second World War.

== Reviews ==
Daniel Finkelstein in The Times described as "A magnificent book. A work of great brilliance. There is narrative sweep and intellectual grip. Everything that happens is inevitable and yet comes as a surprise. I was moved to anger and to pity. In places I gasped, in places I wept. I wanted to reach the end. I couldn't wait to reach the end. And then when I got there I didn't want to be at the end."

Caroline Moorehead, writing for Literary Review, praised Sands as a "voracious researcher", writing: "it is impossible not to enjoy his exuberant pleasure in what he calls the 'muck of evidence'. No possible fruitful line of enquiry is passed over."

John le Carré called it: "A monumental achievement: profoundly personal, told with love, anger and great precision."

Dominic Sandbrook in The Sunday Times wrote: "Supremely gripping. Sands has produced something extraordinary. Written with novelistic skill, its prose effortlessly poised, its tone perfectly judged, his book teems with life, from the bustling streets of Habsburg Lviv to the high drama of the Nuremberg trials. One of the most gripping and powerful books imaginable."

== Prizes ==
- The Baillie Gifford Prize, 2016
- Best History Books of the Year, The Guardian, 2016
- The Jewish Quarterly-Wingate Prize, 2017
- Non-fiction Book of the Year at the British Book Awards, 2017
- "Baron Jean-Charles Velge" Prize of the International Chair of the History of the Second World War at the ULB (Free University of Brussels) 2019
