= Rafael Behr =

British newspaper columnist

Rafael Lawrence Behr (born 7 June 1974) is a British journalist and author. He has been a political columnist and leader writer at The Guardian since 2014. He has appeared as a commentator on the BBC, Sky News and various political podcasts. His work has also appeared in Prospect magazine, The Times, The Sunday Times, The New York Times and The Irish Times. In 2023 he published his first book, Politics, A Survivor's Guide.

== Early life and education ==
Rafael Behr was born in London to South African parents of Lithuanian Jewish heritage. He has one older brother. He attended City of London School for Boys and Merton College, Oxford, where he studied French and Russian. He took a master's degree in Russian politics and literature at University College London's School of Slavonic and East European Studies.

== Journalism ==
Before writing his column at The Guardian, Behr was political editor of the New Statesman.

He has previously been chief leader writer and online editor for The Observer and a foreign correspondent for the Financial Times, covering the Baltic States and Russia. In 2014, Behr was named political commentator of the year at the 2014 Comment Awards. In 2019, he was shortlisted for the same award.

In his career before journalism, Behr worked as a political risk analyst reporting on the countries of the former Soviet Union.

Since 2020 he has presented Politics on the Couch, an occasional podcast about the psychology of politics.

== Views ==
In his book, Politics: A Survivor's Guide, Behr identifies himself as sympathetic to social democracy, liberalism and centrism. Behr was a strong supporter of Britain's membership of the European Union and has been critical of Brexit and the Conservative governments that implemented it. He was also critical of Jeremy Corbyn's leadership of the Labour Party after 2015.

== Personal life ==
Behr lives in Brighton, on the south coast of England, with his wife and two daughters.
