= Otto Wächter =

Austrian Nazi lawyer and politician (1901–1949)

Baron Otto Gustav von Wächter
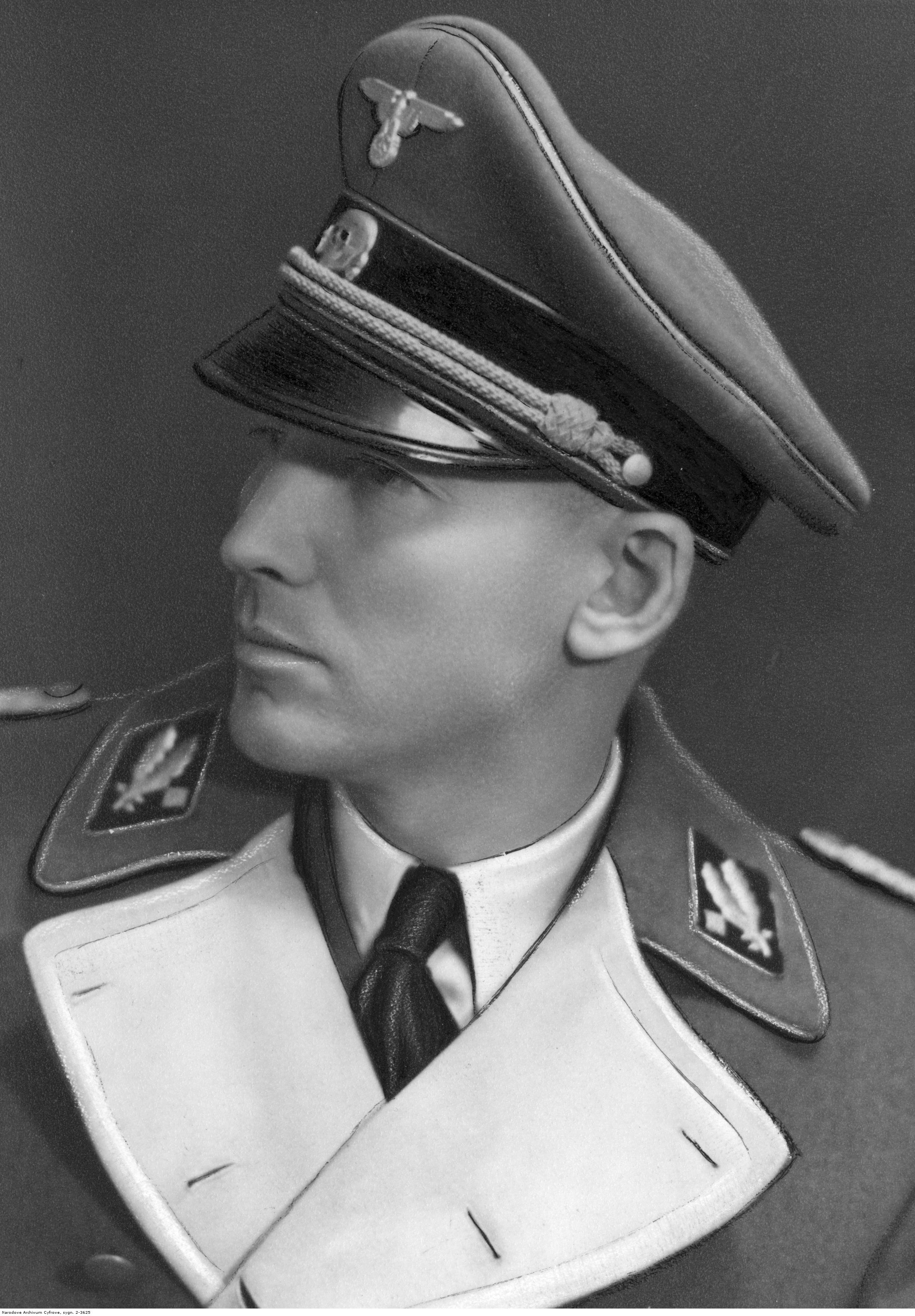
- SS-Gruppenführer Otto Wächter

Governor of the Kraków District
- In office 26 October 1939 – 22 January 1942
- Governor General: Hans Frank
- Preceded by: Office established
- Succeeded by: Richard Wendler

Governor of the District of Galicia
- In office 22 January 1942 – 1944
- Governor General: Hans Frank
- Preceded by: Karl Lasch
- Succeeded by: Office abolished

Personal details
- Born: 8 July 1901 Vienna, Austria-Hungary
- Died: 14 July 1949 (aged 48) Rome, Italy
- Spouse: Charlotte Bleckmann (m. 1932)

Military service
- Allegiance: First Austrian Republic; Nazi Germany
- Branch/service: Waffen-SS
- Years of service: 1923–1945
- Rank: SS-Gruppenführer

Baron Otto Gustav von Wächter (8 July 1901 – 14 July 1949) was an Austrian lawyer, Nazi politician and high-ranking member of the SS, a paramilitary organisation of the Nazi Party. He participated in the extermination of Jews in Europe during the Holocaust and was instrumental in creating an SS division consisting of Ukrainians.

During the occupation of Poland in World War II, he was the governor of the district of Kraków in the General Government and later of the District of Galicia (now mainly in Ukraine). In 1944 he was appointed head of the German Military Administration in the puppet Italian Social Republic. During the last two months of the war, he was responsible for the non-German forces at the Reich Security Main Office (RSHA) in Berlin.

In 1940, Wächter ordered the expulsion of 68,000 Polish Jews from Kraków and in 1941 the Kraków Ghetto was created for the remaining 15,000 Jews by his decrees. After the war, wanted by the Polish People's Republic, Wächter managed to evade Allied authorities for four years. In 1949 he was given refuge by the pro-Nazi Austrian bishop Alois Hudal in the Vatican, where he died the same year, aged 48, reportedly from kidney disease.

== Early life ==
Otto Gustav von Wächter was the third child and only son of Martha (née Pfob), daughter of the owner of the Graben Hotel in the centre of Vienna. His father, Joseph Freiherr von Wächter, was born in northern Bohemia and served in the Austro-Hungarian Army. In the last year of the First World War, Joseph was decorated with the Knight's Cross of the Order of Maria Theresa, which earned him the title of Freiherr (Baron). In 1922, after the First Austrian Republic was established, he was twice nominated as Minister of Defence in the Cabinets of Johann Schober (in the first replacing Carl Vaugoin).

Otto von Wächter spent his first years in Vienna before the family moved to Trieste (then part of Austria-Hungary) in 1908. For the duration of the First World War, he lived in southern Bohemia, studying and taking his Matura school leaving examinations in 1919 in České Budějovice, then called by its German name, Budweis, where everyday life was dominated by the national differences between Germans and Czechs.

The family moved to Vienna, where Wächter studied law and joined national and sporting organizations. In April 1923, he joined the Sturmabteilung (SA) and became Austrian Champion in M8+ (eight-man rowing team). He received his doctorate in 1924 and in 1929 began practicing as a lawyer. His clients included indicted members of the Nazi Party, which he joined on 24 October 1930 (party No: 301093). On 11 September 1932, Wächter married Charlotte Bleckmann (born 20 October 1908), daughter of a Styrian steel magnate. The couple eventually had six children, including four daughters and two sons: Otto Richard (1933–1997) and Horst Arthur (born 1939).

Wächter continued to work for the Nazi Party in Vienna as an organizer and defender of accused Nazis in court and played a leading role in the organization of the failed July Putsch of 25 July 1934, which eventually led to the assassination of Chancellor Engelbert Dollfuss. After the failed coup, Wächter fled to Nazi Germany. He entered the Schutzstaffel (SS No: 235368) on 1 January 1932 and completed his German military service in Freising, Bavaria. In 1935, his Austrian citizenship was revoked and German citizenship conferred upon him while he completed his academic training and education as a lawyer in Germany. In 1937, he started working in the relief organization for Austrian National Socialists seeking refuge in Berlin.

The day after the annexation of Austria into Nazi Germany on 12 March 1938, Wächter returned to Vienna, where he took on the post of state commissar in the "Liquidation Ministry" under the Nazi governor of Austria, Arthur Seyss-Inquart, from 24 May 1938 to 30 April 1939. The government body he headed was known as the "Wächter-Kommission" and was responsible for the dismissal and/or compulsory retirement of all Austrian officials who did not conform with the Nazi regime. Because the former Austrian bureaucracy was strictly antisemitic, only a small fraction of the officials were actually dismissed.

== World War II ==
=== Governor of Kraków ===
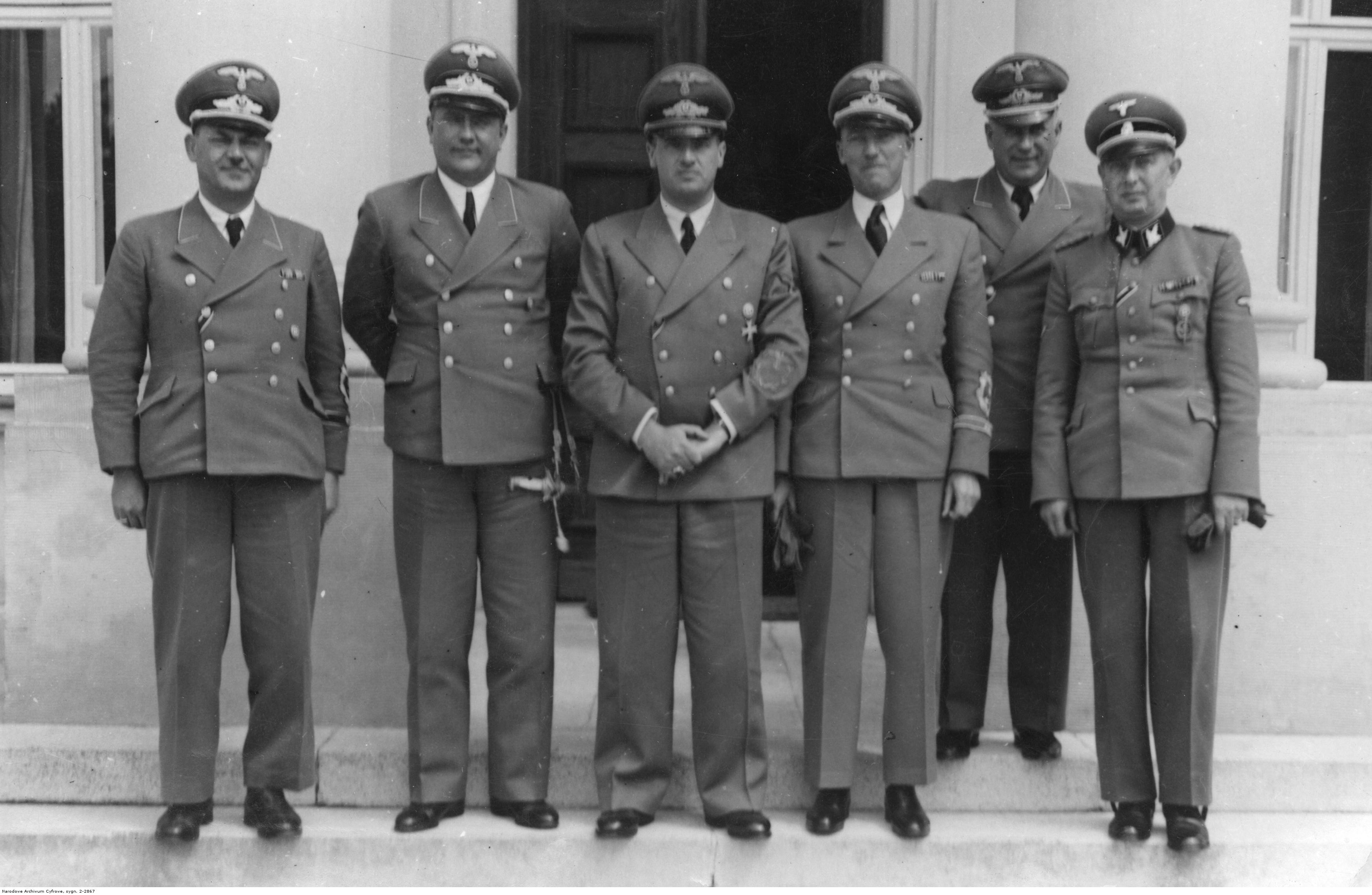
Hans Frank with district administrators in 1942. From left: Ernst Kundt, Ludwig Fischer, Frank, Otto von Wächter, Ernst Zörner, Richard Wendler.

Following the invasion of Poland in September 1939, the Germans established a state known as the General Government which was ruled over by Hans Frank. Until 1940, his deputy was Arthur Seyss-Inquart, who took Wächter with him to the General Government, where Wächter was appointed governor of the administrative district of Kraków, Poland. Wächter chose the two crowns of Galicia in the coat-of-arms issued for the nobility of his father. As Governor of Kraków, he was under the direct and local supervision of Frank and had to face the fanatical actions of the local SS and police forces.

The arrest on 6 November 1939 of the entire staff of professors and academics of the Jagiellonian University and other academic institutions and their subsequent deportation to Sachsenhausen concentration camp, an event known as Sonderaktion Krakau, resulted in worldwide condemnation. Wächter publicly criticised the action, which took place without his knowledge, and reportedly tried to free the academics. Due to the "Special Action Kraków", he was indicted by exiled Poles in New York in 1942.

In his capacity as governor, an execution warrant for 52 Poles in Bochnia was issued 18 December 1939 under Wächter's signature, as reprisal for killing two Viennese police officers. Likewise in December 1940, a decree organizing the expulsion of the city's 68,000 Jews also appeared under his name, as did a further decree ordering the remaining 15,000 Jews to move into the newly created Kraków Ghetto ("Jewish Residence Zone") issued 3 March 1941.

Unlike his wife who was often in the company of the Franks, Wächter tried to keep his distance from them. The family lived in a pseudo-Romanesque villa in Przegorzaly on a steep slope above the Vistula outside Kraków, which belonged to Professor Szyszko-Bohusz, head of the restoration measures of the Royal Wawel. The atmosphere of the confiscated building did not meet with the approval of Wächter's wife, so she built a house which she called "Wartenberg Castle". Frustrated with the severe limitations of his role, Wächter was about to resign from his office in Kraków when he received a new posting in Galicia.

=== Governor of Galicia ===
Following the German invasion of the Soviet Union on 22 June 1941, the Soviet-occupied eastern part of the former Austrian province of Galicia was attached to the General Government as the District of Galicia. Its capital city, variously known as L'viv (Ukrainian), Lwów (Polish) and Lemberg (German), had been the fourth-largest in the Austro-Hungarian Empire, where Poles, Ukrainians and Jews had lived together for centuries. The first German governor was Karl Lasch, an intimate friend of Frank, who was later arrested and shot for extensive black market activities on the orders of Reichsführer-SS Heinrich Himmler. Wächter was chosen by Adolf Hitler "as the best man on the spot", and installed as Governor on 22 January 1943.

His first official visit was to the influential and respected Greek Catholic Metropolit Andrij Aleksander Szeptycki (Sheptytsky). With his assistance, Wächter endeavored to promote a greater degree of co-operation among the occupying Germans and the ethnic elements in the District of Galicia. Consequently, he immediately found himself in conflict with SS-Obergruppenführer Friedrich-Wilhelm Krüger, Himmler's representative in the General Government and executor of his planned large-scale resettlement programs. At the government meeting in Kraków on 17 February, Wächter publicly opposed plans to "germanize" the city of Lemberg, which would have resulted in the expulsion of its entire population, stating: "A German colonization of the East during the war would bring about the collapse of production."

Wächter's continued opposition to Krüger's policies led to a number of open confrontations. To avoid further altercations, Himmler offered Wächter the chance to relocate to Vienna, which he declined. As Governor of Galicia, he remained a firm believer in the principle of "Germany first". He was frequently obliged to use his influence and connections by first circumventing General Governor Hans Frank and by exploiting the strained relations between Frank and Himmler to pursue his own policies. Wächter selected men with liberal views for the key posts in his administration, notably his department heads Otto Bauer and Ludwig Losacker, whom he consulted before deciding all important issues.

In late 1942, Wächter visited the Reichskommissariat Ukraine (eastern Ukraine) to witness firsthand the effect of the implementation of the Nazi Untermensch (subhuman) philosophy by Gauleiter Erich Koch and his policies of repression and subjugation. On his return in December 1942, he sent a secret ten-page letter to Martin Bormann in the Führer Headquarters in Berlin, criticizing the serious mistakes made in the handling of the Ukrainians.

Whilst Governor of Galicia, he established a Waffen-SS Division recruited from the Ukrainian population of Galicia, under German supervision, to fight against the Red Army. The formation of the unit was approved by Himmler after the disastrous German defeat at Stalingrad. Wächter submitted the proposal to Himmler on 1 March 1943, and, on 28 April, the SS Division Galicia was publicly inaugurated.

=== Involvement in the Holocaust ===
Nazi documents detail Wächter's involvement with the establishment of ghettos and the implementation of the Final Solution, the genocide of Europe's Jews. Wächter's name is seen on the order to establish the Kraków ghetto, where many inhabitants perished, and the rest would eventually be liquidated as a part of Operation Reinhard. Wächter also ran the transportation systems, which would carry trains of Jews to their deaths under his watch. The U.S. Justice Department also holds documents indicting Wächter. One, signed on March 13, 1942, by Wächter, was an order to restrict the employment of Jews throughout Galicia. The Justice Department also maintains a document from Heinrich Himmler to Wilhelm Stuckart, the State Secretary to the Reich Minister of the Interior in Berlin, on Wächter's future, dated August 25, 1942. It describes how Himmler was recently in Lemberg and asked Wächter if he would want to be transferred out to Vienna. Wächter replied to Himmler that he did not want to go to Vienna. This document implies Wächter willingly chose to stay in Lemberg for the implementation of Operation Reinhard and directly refutes Horst's claim that his father "had no chance to leave the system."

While Wächter was Governor of Galicia, he oversaw the implementation of the Final Solution. After 75,000 Jews died in the first month during Operation Reinhard, Hans Frank made a speech in the Parliament of Galicia praising Wächter's work for "making Lemberg a proud city." Although these actions would almost certainly indict Wächter for command responsibility, Wächter was not directly responsible for Operation Reinhard, since he was a member of the civil government. The dual German administration in the General Government meant that he did not control the SS or Police; these matters in Lemberg were under the control of SS-Brigadeführer Fritz Katzmann, the SS and Police Leader of the District of Galicia. Although he likely would have worked closely with the SS to carry out the operations, he was not directly a part of the group that implemented them.

As far as direct responsibility, Nazi hunter Simon Wiesenthal claims in his book The Murderers Among Us, that Wächter personally oversaw the transportation of four thousand Jews to extermination camps and was responsible for killing at least 800,000 Jews. Specifically, Wiesenthal also claims to have seen Wächter in Lemberg on August 15, 1942, while his mother and other Jews were being loaded on a train to be taken to their deaths. However, Horst owns a letter written by his father for his mother on that date, from a party meeting in Krakow. Horst believes Wiesenthal may have mistaken Fritz Katzmann for his father since, according to the letter, Wächter was not in Lemberg on August 15.

On September 28, 1946, the Polish government sent a document to the Military Governor of the American occupation zone in Germany requesting "that Wächter be delivered to Poland for trial for mass murder, shooting and executions. Under his command of District Galicia, more than one hundred thousand Polish citizens lost their lives." Due to Wächter's death in Rome in 1949, he was never tried for charges in Poland. The extent of his criminal involvement in the Final Solution was never brought before a court.

=== Waffen-SS Galizien ===
In 1943, Wächter conceived the idea of creating a Waffen-SS division made up of Ukrainians. The division was organized as a part of a program of creating foreign (e.g., Estonian, Latvian) formations of the Waffen-SS to fight with the Germans on the Soviet front. Wachter first proposed his idea to SS Reichsführer Heinrich Himmler on March 1, 1943, and wanted to name them Division Ukraine. Wächter succeeded in creating the division, but they were ultimately called Division Galizien. The creation of the Division Galizien was announced on April 28, 1943, at ceremonies throughout Galicia. Wächter appointed the members of the Military Board of the Division Galizien and had good relations with them. In 1945, he was the commander in chief of all Waffen SS divisions made up of non-Germans. In organizing Waffen-SS Galizien, Wächter worked closely with the head of the Ukrainian Central Committee in Cracow, Volodymyr Kubijovyč.

In March 1945, the German government announced the formation of the Ukrainian National Army. Wächter successfully secured the appointment of General Pavlo Shandruk, a former officer in the Polish Army, as commander of the Ukrainian National Army. On April 25, 1945, the Waffen-SS Galizien was officially reorganized as the First Division of the Ukrainian National Army, and swear a new oath of loyalty to the Ukrainian people.

Modern Ukraine remains divided on the legacy of World War II, although nationalists, hardcore rightists and neo-Nazis continue to honor the Waffen-SS Galizien today through yearly celebrations.

== End of the war ==
With the loss of the entire District of Galicia on 26 July 1944 to the advancing Red Army, Wächter sought to be released from his administrative obligations in the General Government so that he could take up a position in the Waffen-SS. In response, Himmler agreed to order his release on the basis that he assume a new commission as "Chief of the Military Administration to the Plenipotentiary General of the German Wehrmacht in Italy headed by SS-Obergruppenfuhrer Karl Wolff. Himmler felt Wächter would be "of immense use in this equally interesting and difficult field." On assuming his new post, Wächter relocated to Gardone on Lake Garda.

As the German situation at the front worsened day by day, in a vain attempt to regain the military initiative the Nazi authorities became increasingly desperate and sought to exploit the Eastern European Anti-Bolshevik movements. In so doing, on 30 January 1945, Himmler appointed Wächter as subsidiary head of Group D of the Reich Security Main Office in Berlin, which sought to utilize and combine the Russian Liberation Army of General Andrey Vlasov and the newly formed Ukrainian National Army which included the 1st Ukrainian Division (formerly the SS 14th Galician Division), the creation of which he had instigated.

Vlasov's 'federalist' concept, which required the subordination of all other former Soviet nationalities to his overall command, proved to be an insurmountable obstacle for Wächter, who was unable to bring about the unification of Vlasov and the separatist Ukrainians led by General Pavlo Shandruk. Nevertheless, Wächter redoubled his efforts with the Ukrainians, whom he rejoined on 7 April 1945 in Carinthia. On 8 May 1945, Wächter informed General Shandruk of the unconditional surrender of the German Reich with the following words: "Now, General, you are the central figure in the action of saving the Division, and possibly of all of us who are with you." In Zell am See, amidst the German collapse, his wife burned a crate full of documents he had methodically collected to justify his deeds, which should demonstrate "that he had done everything to help so many people".

== Post-war life and death ==
Following the defeat of Germany, Wächter remained with the staff of the 1st Division of the Ukrainian National Army until 10 May. He left them near Tamsweg in the Salzburg mountain district to avoid being taken prisoner and inevitable extradition to the Soviet Union. Together with a young member of the 24th Waffen-Gebirgs-(Karstjäger-) Division of the Waffen-SS, he successfully hid for four years, sustained by his wife who supplied both men with food and equipment from secret pick-up points. In the spring of 1949, Wächter crossed the border to South Tyrol in Italy where he met his wife and his elder children for the last time.

On 24 April 1949, he arrived in Rome, where, through pro-Nazi Bishop Alois Hudal, rector of the Teutonic College of Santa Maria dell'Anima, he found rudimentary accommodation in the clerical institute "Vigna Pia" on the southern outskirts of Rome under the name of Alfredo Reinhardt. In June, he took part in an Italian film, playing the part of an actor and was in the process of collecting information about a flight to South America. As a result of his daily morning swim in the polluted Tiber, he appeared jaundiced on 3 July. On 9 July, he was taken to Santo Spirito Hospital near the Vatican where Wächter revealed his true identity. He received last rites from Hudal in the evening of 13 July and died the next morning. He died, most likely, of leptospirosis (Weil's disease), although it has been alleged by Hudal that he was poisoned.

== Dealing of the Wächter family with the history ==
His son Horst has claimed that his father "was against the racial ideology of putting other races below Aryan Germans" and maintains he never made an antisemitic speech. He has described him as "an unwilling cog in the Nazi killing machine", who "became doomed and murdered for something he never planned and executed himself." Horst's claims have been refuted by considerable evidence. This includes family photo albums held by Horst himself at his home, Schloss Hagenberg (near Mistelbach, Lower Austria; the albums feature pictures of Otto Wächter with Adolf Hitler, Heinrich Himmler, Hans Frank and Joseph Goebbels, and a book with the inscription "With my best wishes on your birthday, —H. Himmler, 8 July 1944." These personal mementos place Wächter among the inner circles of the Nazi party, and at the heart of its day-to-day operations.

Horst's daughter Magdalena Wächter-Stanfel is the only one out of 23 grandchildren who admits publicly that her grandfather "was a mass murderer". This had cost her an inheritance from her father Horst, who sold the Hagenberg castle that they had bought with the money that had come to him through his late mother Charlotte, wife of Otto Wächter, which is possibly also the money of sold looted pictures from Poland for a little money to mobile traders so that Magdalena would not get it after his death. The new owner of the castle continues to support Horst in letting him remain in the castle and try to present the castle as a romantic-esoteric place without mentioning its difficult connection to the Wächter story.

== See also ==
- List SS-Gruppenführer

== Bibliography ==
- Christian Blankenstein, Die Merk-würdigen von Gestern und ihre Spuren im Heute pp. 176–192: Alois Hudal der Bischof und die Nazis, Nordhausen 2011
- Peter Broucek (ed.): Ein General im Zwielicht. Die Erinnerungen Edmund Glaise von Horstenau. Band 2. Böhlau Verlag, Wien - Köln - Graz 1983
- Hans Frank, Das Diensttagebuch des deutschen Generalgouverneurs in Polen 1939–1945 Microfilm Federal Archive Berlin – Munich.
- Towiah Friedman (ed.): Die zwei illegale (sic!) Nazis Dr. Otto Wächter als Gouverneur in Krakau und Lemberg und Rudolf Pavlu als Stadthauptmann in Krakau waren beteiligt an der Ermordung der Juden in Krakau und Lemberg, - Collection of documents, Haifa 2002
- Wolf-Dietrich Heike: Sie wollten die Freiheit. Die Geschichte der ukrainischen Division 1943 - 1945, Podzun-Verlag, Dorheim/H. 1974
- Ludwig Losacker: Von der Schwierigkeit ein Deutscher zu sein - Erinnerungen an das besetzte Polen (The difficulty of being a German - Memories of occupied Poland), c. 1980 German Federal Archive Koblenz, copy Archives Wächter
- Michael James Melnyk: To Battle, The Formation and History of the 14th Galician Waffen-SS Division, Helion and Co, Solihull England 2002
- Sylvia Maderegger, die Juden im österreichischen Ständestaat 1934-1938, Vienna 1973
- Dieter Pohl: Nationalsozialistische Judenverfolgung in Ostgalizien, 1941-1944. Oldenbourg, München 1997, ISBN 3-486-56233-9.
- Werner Präg & Wolfgang Jacobmeyer (ed.): Das Diensttagebuch des deutschen Generalgouverneurs in Polen 1939–1945, Stuttgart 1975
- Thomas Sandkühler: Endlösung in Galizien. Der Judenmord in Ostpolen und die Rettungsinitiativen von Berthold Beitz 1941-1944. Dietz Nachfolger, Bonn 1996, ISBN 3-8012-5022-9.
- Dieter Schenk: Krakauer Burg – Die Machtzentrale des Generalgouverneurs Hans Frank 1939-1945. Ch. Links Verlag, Berlin 2010
- Andreas Schulz/Dieter Zinke: Die Generale der Waffen-SS und der Polizei Band 6, pp. 77 – 127: Dr.iur. Karl Otto Gustav (Freiherr von) Wächter, Bissendorf 2012
- Pavlo Shandruk: Arms of Valor. Trenton, New Jersey, 1959:
- Hansjakob Stehle: Der Lemberger Metropolit Septyckyj und die nationalsozia¬listi¬sche Politik in der Ukraine. In. Vierteljahrshefte für Zeitgeschichte 34 (1986) S. 407-425
- Archive Wächter, Hagenberg Castle, Lower Austria: Bequest Charlotte von Wächter and recollections Horst von Wächter, unpublished
- Wolfgang Graf, Österreichische SS-Generäle, pp. 209–214, Klagenfurt 2012
- Peter Witte, "Two Decisions Concerning the 'Final Solution of the Jewish Question'", Holocaust and Genocide Studies, 9/3, London/Jerusalem, 1995.
- Nikolaus von Preradovich, Österreichs höhere SS-Führer, Berg am See, 1987.
- Simon Wiesenthal, The Murderers Among Us, McGraw-Hill, New York, 1967
- Basil Dmytryshyn, "The Nazis and the SS Volunteer Division 'Galicia'", American Slavic and East European Review, Vol. 15, No. 1. (February 1956), pp. 1–10.
- Magdalena Ogórek: Lista Wächtera. Generał SS, który ograbił Kraków, Zona Zero 2017. ISBN 978-83-948743-2-2
- Philippe Sands: The Ratline: Love, Lies and Justice on the Trail of a Nazi Fugitive, Weidenfeld and Nicolson, London, 2020. ISBN 978-1-47460-812-1
