= Jane's Intelligence Review =

- Discipline: current affairs
- Language: English
- Edited by: Robert Munks

Publication details
- History: 1989
- Publisher: Jane's Information Group
- Frequency: Monthly

Standard abbreviations
- ISO 4: Jane's Intell. Rev.

Indexing
- ISSN: 2048-349X (print); 0955-1247 (web)

Links
- Journal homepage

Jane's Intelligence Review was a monthly journal on global security and stability issues published by Jane's Information Group. Its coverage includes international security issues, state stability, terrorism and insurgency, ongoing conflicts, organized crime, and weapons proliferation.

== History ==
=== Jane's Soviet Intelligence Review (1989–1991) ===
It was first published in January 1989 as Jane's Soviet Intelligence Review, although a pilot edition had been produced in September the previous year and distributed at the Farnborough Airshow in order to test the market. Uniquely for Jane's—and its then parent company, the Thomson Corporation—the magazine carried no advertising but relied on subscription revenue only. It was profitable in its first year of publication and is believed to have remained profitable ever since. Among the first subscribers were the then vice-president of the United States, Dan Quayle, and the author Tom Clancy. Included in the January 1989 issue were articles on the Soviet 2S6 air-defence system, the Soviet Mi-24 helicopter and the new commanding general of the Group of Soviet Forces in Germany, Army General Stanislav Postnikov.

=== Jane's Intelligence Review (1991–present) ===
In 1991 in response to the breakup of the Warsaw Pact, the magazine changed its title to Jane's Intelligence Review although it had already expanded its coverage to include a special report on Iraq in October 1990 following that country's invasion of Kuwait.

In July 1993 it published what is thought to be the first open source reference to "Osameh bin Ladin" who "focused his activities on the military side of jihad and poured millions of dollars into training camps." In August 2001 it carried a cover feature on Al Qaeda which documented the "genesis, operational methods and organisational structure of the Bin Laden network.

It was also the source of some of the material plagiarized in the Blair government's infamous "Dodgy Dossier" concerning Iraq's alleged weapons of mass destruction.

The magazine in its current form focuses on a range of global security/stability issues, and includes regular features on international security, state stability, terrorism and insurgency, organised crime, and proliferation and procurement. These articles are written by a wide range of expert authors and on-the-ground correspondents.

Jane's Intelligence Review and Jane's International Defence Review were rolled into Janes Defence and Intelligence Review.

== Editors ==
- Paul Beaver: pilot issue, 1988
- Henry Dodds: 1989–1992
- Robert Hall: 1992-1997
- Peter Felstead
- Christopher Aaron
- Paul Burton
- Christian Le Mière: 2006–2010
- Anna Gilmour: 2010–2012
- Matthew Clements: 2012–2014
- Robert Munks: 2014
