= Bush–Aznar memo =

2003 documentation of a conversation between world leaders

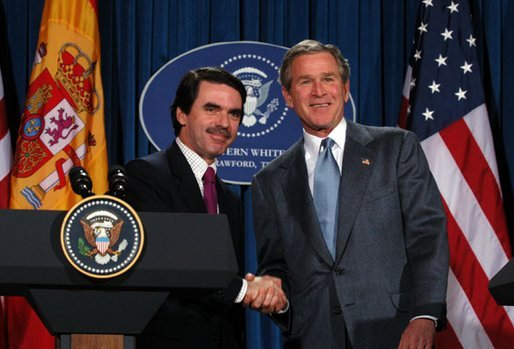
Bush and Aznar at a public press conference in Crawford on February 22, 2003, the same day as the conversation documented in the memo

The Bush–Aznar memo is reportedly a documentation of a February 22, 2003 conversation in Crawford, Texas, between US president George W. Bush, Prime Minister of Spain José María Aznar, National Security Advisor Condoleezza Rice, Daniel Fried, Alberto Carnero, and Javier Rupérez, the Spanish ambassador to the U.S. British prime minister Tony Blair and Italian prime minister Berlusconi participated by telephone. Rupérez transcribed the meeting's details which El País, a Madrid daily newspaper, published on September 26, 2007. The conversation focuses on the efforts of the US, UK, and Spain to get a second resolution passed by the United Nations Security Council. This "second resolution" would have followed Resolution 1441. Supporters of the resolution also referred to it as the "eighteenth resolution" in reference to the 17 UN resolutions that Iraq had failed to comply with.

The memo provided insight into the run-up to the 2003 invasion of Iraq. It revealed that Saddam Hussein had offered to step down and leave Iraq if he were allowed to keep $1 billion. Some have suggested that this indicates that the war was avoidable. The memo also possible motivations for members of the United Nations Security Council to support US policy: he tells Aznar that failures to support the resolution could endanger Angola's foreign aid from the Millennium Challenge Account and the pending free trade agreement with Chile (awaiting ratification in the United States Senate at the time). Another portion of the transcript shows Bush's confidence in Iraq's stability after the invasion.

== Summary of the transcript ==
The transcript begins with Bush saying he wants to pursue a second resolution quickly, two or three days after the meeting. Aznar prefers three days later so the General Affairs and External Relations Council can meet beforehand. Bush envisions a resolution similar to one passed during the Kosovo conflict, and "he wants it written so that it does not contain obligatory elements, that does not mention the use of force, and that states that Saddam Hussein has been unable to fulfill his obligations."

Aznar then asks if there will be another, parallel declaration. Condoleezza Rice responds that there will not. Rice reiterates the desire for a simple resolution that would not include stages Hussein could use to stall. She also mentions that they are meeting with Hans Blix in an attempt to get information that could be used in the resolution.

Bush says that "Saddam Hussein won't change and he'll continue to play games. The time has come to get rid of him." Bush says that they will proceed with the invasion even if the resolution is vetoed, but he believes they will be able to get the second resolution passed. Bush mentions that the coalition forces will be ready to invade in two weeks (second week of March 2003), and they expect to be in Baghdad by the end of March.

Bush goes on to discuss various possibilities of what will happen to Hussein. He gives an estimated 15% chance that Hussein will be dead or gone by the time Baghdad falls. Bush reveals that Hussein seems to prefer exile over standing his ground, and that Hussein has told the Egyptians that he will leave Iraq if he can take $1 billion and information on weapons of mass destruction.

Bush continues to talk and moves to discussing post-invasion Iraq. He says that he expects Hussein's generals to put up resistances by blowing up infrastructure, especially oil wells. Bush says that invading forces will seize the oil wells very early on to prevent this. Meanwhile, he says Saudi Arabia will produce extra oil to cover any disruption in the oil market. Bush thinks they can "win without destruction," and that Iraq has good foundations including a strong bureaucracy and civil society. Bush envisions Iraq government by a federation.

Aznar returns the conversation to the resolution. Aznar wants the resolution to mention that Hussein has lost his chance. Bush replies that he cares little about the content of the message, and Aznar responds that the Spanish will send the Americans some text for the resolution. Bush says they do not have a set text—only the requirement that Saddam be disarmed. Aznar says that his text will be written to draw more international support, and Bush consents. Aznar then discusses his upcoming meeting with President of France Jacques Chirac on February 26, shortly after the resolution is announced. Bush says that Chirac thinks of himself as "Mr Arab," and that the two have a rivalry over the Arab world.

Aznar then returns to the subject of the UN inspectors' report. Rice answers that they do not expect to get much out of the report, and the Iraqis can be expected to show some minor steps of compliance to coincide with the report. Bush compares this waiting game to "Chinese water torture," and that he will not wait past the middle of March.

Bush says he will put pressure on countries to get their support. He says that failure to support the resolution could endanger foreign aid to Angola the ratification of a free trade agreement with Chile in the senate.

Aznar asks if there is a chance that Hussein will go into exile. Bush responds that it is a possibility, and another that Hussein may even be assassinated. Bush says Hussein expects to be able to not be prosecuted in exile but that it is expected that more of Hussein's hidden crimes will be discovered, and he would then be judged in international court in The Hague.

Aznar says that the best outcome would be a bloodless victory. Bush, acknowledging the death and destruction of war, agrees. "Moreover, it would save $50 billion."

Aznar then asks Bush for help with boosting public (presumably Spanish) opinion. Bush responds that he will help by making a speech outlining his goals and putting the issue in a "higher context." Aznar relates his concern that he is breaking with historical Spanish policy. Bush responds that he too is guided by history, and that he does not want history to judge him and say that he did not do his duty. Also, he went to the Security Council when some in his administration sought to avoid the UN entirely. Aznar tells Bush "Only your optimism worries me." Bush replies, "I am optimistic because I believe that I am in the right. I am at peace with myself. We have the job of confronting a serious threat to peace." Bush then implies that Europeans are shirking their duties because of racist attitudes. He then says he has a good relationship with Kofi Annan.

The transcript ends with Bush saying, "The more the Europeans attack me, the stronger I am in the United States." Aznar replies, "We must make your strength compatible with the esteem of the Europeans."

== Text ==
President Bush: We are in favor of getting a second resolution in the Security Council and would want to do it quickly. We would want to announce it Monday or Tuesday [24 or 25 of February 2003].

Prime minister Aznar: Better Tuesday, after the meeting of the Council of General Affairs of the European Union. It is important to maintain the momentum gained by the resolution at the summit of the European Union [in Brussels, Monday 17 of February]. We would prefer to wait until Tuesday.

Bush: It could be in the evening Monday, considering the time difference. In any case, the next week. We will see that the resolution is written so that it does not contain obligatory steps [for Iraq], that it does not mention the use of force, and that it states that Saddam Hussein has been unable to fulfill his obligations. That type of resolution can be voted for by many people. It would be something similar to the one passed regarding Kosovo [the 10th of June 1999].

Aznar: Would it be presented to the Security Council before, and independently of, a parallel declaration?

Condoleezza Rice: In fact there would not be parallel declaration. We are thinking about as simple a resolution as possible, without many details regarding [Iraq's] obligations–such that Saddam Hussein could use them as stages and consequently could neglect to fulfill them. We are speaking with Blix [head of the inspectors of the UN] and others of his team to get ideas that can serve to introduce the resolution.

Bush: Saddam Hussein will not change and will continue playing games. The moment has come to be rid of him. That's the way it is. As for me, from now on I will try to tone down the rhetoric as much as possible, while we seek approval of the resolution. If somebody uses a veto, we will go. [Russia, China and France have, along with the US and the United Kingdom the right to a veto in the Security Council by virtue of being permanent members] Saddam Hussein is not disarming. We have to take him right now. We have shown an incredible degree of patience so far. There are two weeks left. In two weeks we will be militarily ready. I believe that we will get the second resolution. In the Security Council we have the three African members [Cameroun, Angola and Guinea], the Chileans, and the Mexicans. I will speak with all of them, also with Putin, naturally. We will be in Baghdad at the end of March. There is a 15% possibility that Saddam Hussein will die or flee. But that possibility will not exist until we have demonstrated our resolve. The Egyptians are talking to Saddam Hussein. It seems that he has indicated that he is willing to go into exile if he can take a billion dollars with him and all the information that he wants on weapons of mass destruction. [Muammar] Gaddafi told Berlusconi that Saddam Hussein wants to go away. Mubarak tells us that in these circumstances it is entirely possible that he will be assassinated. We would like to act with the mandate of the United Nations. If we act militarily we will do it with great precision, tightly focusing on our objectives. We will decimate the troops loyal to him, and the regular army quickly will recognize what is going on. We have sent a very clear message to Saddam's generals: we will treat them like war criminals. We know that they have accumulated an enormous amount of dynamite to demolish bridges and other infrastructure and to blow up the oil wells. We foresee occupying those wells very quickly. Also, the Saudis will help us by putting on the market all the petroleum that is necessary. We are developing a package of very extensive humanitarian aid. We can win without destruction. We are already planning for a post-Saddam Iraq, and I believe that there are good bases for a better future. Iraq has a relatively good bureaucracy and a civil society. It can be organized as a federal system. Meanwhile, we are doing everything possible to take care of the political needs of our friends and allies.

Aznar: It is very important to have a resolution. It is not the same to act with it as without it. It would be very advisable to have a majority in the Security Council that supported that resolution. In fact, it is important to have it passed by a majority, even if someone exercises a veto. Let us consider that the text of the resolution would have among other things to state that Saddam Hussein has lost his opportunity.

Bush: Yes, by all means. It would be better to have a reference to "necessary means" [a reference to the type of UN resolution that authorizes the use of "all necessary means"].

Aznar: Saddam Hussein has not cooperated, has not been disarmed; we would have to summarize his breaches and to send a more detailed message. That would allow, for example, Mexico to move [a reference to a change in its negative position on the second resolution, the extent of which Aznar could have known about from the lips of president Vicente Fox on Friday, February 21, in Mexico City].

Bush: The resolution will be custom-made in such a way that it will help you. I don't care much about the content.

Aznar: We will send you some sample texts.

Bush: We do not have any text. Only a criterion: that Saddam Hussein disarm. We cannot allow Saddam Hussein to drag things out until the summer. After all, this last stage has already lasted four months, and this is more than enough time to disarm.

Aznar: Having a text would allow us to sponsor it and to be its coauthors, and to arrange for many others to sponsor it.

Bush: Perfect.

Aznar: The next Wednesday [(2)6 of February] I will meet with Chirac. The resolution will already have begun to circulate.

Bush: It seems to me all very good. Chirac knows the reality perfectly. Their intelligence services have explained it to him. The Arabs are transmitting a very clear message to Chirac: Saddam Hussein must go. The problem is that Chirac thinks he is Mister Arab, but in fact he is making their lives impossible. But I do not want to have any rivalry with Chirac. We have different points of view, but I would like that to be all. Give him my best regards. Really! The less rivalry he feels exists between us, the better it will be for everyone.

Aznar: How to combine the resolution with the report of the inspectors?

Condoleezza Rice: Actually there will not be a report on February 28, but the inspectors will present a report written on March 1. We don't have high hopes for that report. As with the previous ones, it will be a mixed picture. I have the impression that Blix will now be more negative than he was before, with regard to the Iraqis' intentions. After the appearance of the inspectors before the Council, we must anticipate a vote on the resolution one week later. The Iraqis, meanwhile, will try to explain that they are fulfilling their obligations. It isn't true, and it won't be sufficient, though they may announce the destruction of some missiles.

Bush: This is like Chinese water torture. We must put an end to it.

Aznar. I agree, but it would be good to have the maximum possible number of people. Have a little patience.

Bush: My patience is exhausted. I don't intend to wait longer than the middle of March.

Aznar: I do not request that you have infinite patience. Simply that you do everything possible so that it all works out.

Bush: Countries like Mexico, Chile, Angola, and Cameroon must realize that what's at stake is the security of the United States, and they should act with a sense of friendship toward us. [Chilean President Ricardo] Lagos should know that the Free Trade Accord with Chile is awaiting Senate confirmation and a negative attitude about this could put ratification in danger. Angola is receiving Millennium Account funds [to help alleviate poverty] and that could be jeopardized also if he's not supportive. And Putin must know that his attitude is putting in danger the relations of Russia with the United States.

Aznar: Tony [Blair] would like to wait until the 14th of March.

Bush: I prefer the 10th. This is like a game of bad cop, good cop. I don't mind being the bad cop, and Blair can be the good one.

Aznar: Is it certain that any possibility exists that Saddam Hussein will go into exile?

Bush: The possibility exists, including that he will be assassinated.

Aznar: Exile with a guarantee?

Bush: No guarantee. He is a thief, a terrorist, a war criminal. Compared with Saddam, Milosevic would be a Mother Teresa. When we go in, we are going to discover many more crimes and we will take him to the Court the International Justice. Saddam Hussein thinks that he has already escaped. He thinks that France and Germany have ceased fulfilling their responsibilities. He also thinks that the demonstrations of the last week [Saturday, February 15] will protect him. And he thinks that I very am weak. But the people around him know that the things are otherwise. They know that his future is in exile or a coffin. For that reason it is very important to maintain the pressure on him. Gaddafi tells us through back channels that that is the only thing that can finish him off. Saddam Hussein's only strategy is to delay, to delay and to delay.

Aznar: In fact the biggest success would be to win the game without firing a single shot and entering Baghdad.

Bush: For me it would be the perfect solution. I do not want war. I know what wars are. I know the destruction and the death that they bring with them. I am the one who has to console the mothers and the widows of the dead. By all means, for us that would be the best solution. In addition, it would save $50 billion.

Aznar: We need you to help us with our public opinion.

Bush: We will do everything we can. Wednesday I am going to speak on the situation in the Middle East, proposing the new peace plan with which you are familiar, and on weapons of mass destruction, on the benefits of a free society, and I will locate the history of Iraq in a wider context. Perhaps it will serve you.

Aznar: What we are doing is a very deep change for Spain and the Spaniards. We are changing the policy that the country had followed for the past two hundred years.

Bush: A historical sense of responsibility guides me just as it does you. When within a few years History judges us, I do not want people to ask themselves why Bush, or Aznar, or Blair did not face their responsibilities. In the end, what people want is to enjoy freedom. Recently, in Romania they reminded me of the example of Ceausescu: it was enough for a woman to call him a liar, for the entire repressive edifice to come down. It is the uncontrollable power of freedom. I am convinced that I will get the resolution.

Aznar: All to the good.

Bush: I made the decision to go to the Security Council. In spite of the disagreements in my Administration, I said to my people that we had to work with our friends. It will be wonderful to get a second resolution.

Aznar: The only thing that worries me about you is your optimism.

Bush: I am optimistic because I believe that I am in the right. I am at peace with myself. It has been up to us to face a serious threat to the peace. It irritates me a great deal to consider the indifference of the Europeans to the sufferings that Saddam Hussein inflicts on Iraqis. Perhaps because he is brown-skinned, far away, and Muslim, many Europeans think that everything is all right in his regard. I will not forget what Solana once said to me: why do we Americans think that the Europeans are anti-Semitic and unable to confront their responsibilities? That defensive attitude is terrible. I have to acknowledge I have just great relations with Kofi Annan.

Aznar: He shares your ethical preoccupations.

Bush: The more the Europeans attack me, the stronger I am in the United States.

Aznar: We would like to make your strength compatible with the esteem of the Europeans.

== See also ==
- Angolagate
- Angola-United States relations
