= David Kelly (weapons expert) =

Welsh biological warfare expert (1944–2003)

David Kelly CMG
- Kelly during a Foreign Affairs Select Committee meeting on 15 July 2003, two days before his death
- Born: David Christopher Kelly; 14 May 1944; Llwynypia, Glamorgan, Wales
- Died: 17 July 2003 (aged 59); Oxfordshire, England
- Cause of death: Suicide
- Body discovered: Harrowdown Hill, Longworth, Oxfordshire
- Education: University of Leeds (BSc); University of Birmingham (MSc); Linacre College, Oxford (DPhil)
- Occupations: Specialist in biological warfare; UN weapons inspector in Iraq
- Employer: Ministry of Defence

David Christopher Kelly CMG (14 May 1944 – 17 July 2003) was a Welsh scientist and authority on biological warfare (BW). A former head of the Defence Microbiology Division working at Porton Down, Kelly was part of a joint US-UK team that inspected civilian biotechnology facilities in Russia in the early 1990s and concluded they were running a covert and illegal BW programme. He was appointed to the United Nations Special Commission (UNSCOM) in 1991 as one of its chief weapons inspectors in Iraq and led ten of the organisation's missions between May 1991 and December 1998. He also worked with UNSCOM's successor, the United Nations Monitoring, Verification and Inspection Commission (UNMOVIC) and led several of their missions into Iraq. During his time with UNMOVIC he was key in uncovering the anthrax production programme at the Salman Pak facility, and a BW programme run at Al Hakum.

A year after the publication of the 2002 dossier on Iraqi weapons of mass destruction—which stated that some of Iraq's chemical and biological weapons were deployable within 45 minutes—Kelly had an off-the-record conversation with Andrew Gilligan, a BBC journalist, about the claim. When Gilligan reported this on BBC Radio 4's Today programme, he stated that the "45 minutes" claim was included at the insistence of Alastair Campbell, the Downing Street Director of Communications; Kelly denied that he said Campbell had forced in the reference. The government complained to the BBC about the claim, but they refused to recant; political tumult between Downing Street and the BBC developed. Kelly informed his line managers in the Ministry of Defence that he might have been the source, but did not think he was the only one, as Gilligan had reported points he had not mentioned. Kelly's name became known to the media, and he was called to appear on 15 July before the parliamentary Intelligence and Security and Foreign Affairs select committees. Two days later Kelly was found dead near his home, having killed himself.

Following Kelly's suicide Tony Blair, the prime minister, set up a government inquiry under Lord Hutton, a former Lord Chief Justice of Northern Ireland. The inquiry concluded that Kelly had killed himself. Hutton also stated that no other parties were involved in Kelly's death. There was continued debate over the manner of Kelly's death, and the case was reviewed between 2010 and 2011 by Dominic Grieve, the attorney general; he concluded that there was "overwhelmingly strong" evidence that Kelly had killed himself. The post-mortem and toxicology reports were released in 2010; both documents supported the conclusion of the Hutton Inquiry. The manner of Kelly's death has been the subject of several documentaries and has been fictionalised on television, on stage and in print. He was appointed as Companion of the Order of St Michael and St George (CMG) in 1994 and might well have been under consideration for a knighthood in May 2003, according to Hutton. His work in Iraq earned him a nomination for the Nobel Peace Prize.

== Biography ==
=== Early life, education and first jobs: 1944–1984 ===
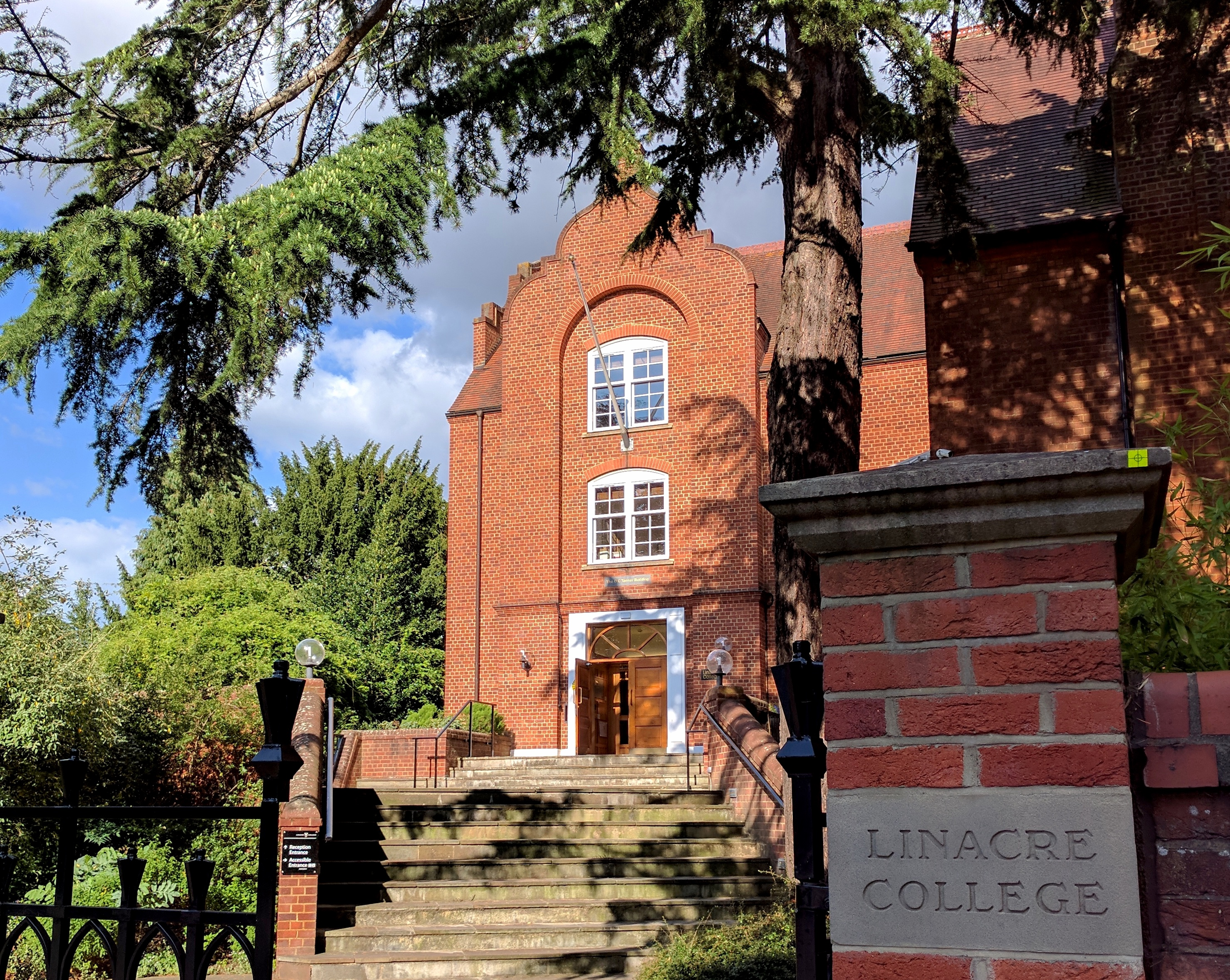
Linacre College, Oxford, where Kelly studied for his doctorate in microbiology

David Christopher Kelly was born in Llwynypia, Glamorgan, South Wales, on 14 May 1944. His parents were Thomas John Kelly and Margaret, née Williams; Thomas was a schoolteacher who was serving in the Royal Air Force Volunteer Reserve as a signals officer during the Second World War. Thomas and Margaret divorced in 1951; she took their young son and moved in with her parents in Pontypridd. From the age of eleven he attended the local grammar school. He was a keen sportsman and musician at school, and represented Wales in the youth cross-country running team; he played double bass in the National Youth Orchestra of Wales and played the saxophone to a high standard.

In 1963 Kelly was admitted to the University of Leeds to study chemistry, botany and biophysics. His mother died two years later from an overdose of prescription barbiturates. Although the coroner's inquest gave an open verdict, Kelly believed she had killed herself. As a result of the death, Kelly suffered from insomnia and was prescribed sleeping pills; he was also given an extra year to complete his degree. (Note: When Kelly was vetted by MI5 for his defence work, his mother's suicide was considered; the MI5 officer noted that the event had made Kelly work harder, and that he was a well-balanced individual.) (Note: Thomas—known as Tim—died in 1984.) He graduated in 1967 with a BSc in bacteriology; he then obtained an MSc in virology from the University of Birmingham. Between his first and second degrees, on 15 July 1967, he married Janice, née Vawdrey, who was studying at Bingley Teacher Training College. (Note: The couple later had a daughter followed, two years later, by twin girls.)

Kelly joined the Insect Pathology Unit at the University of Oxford in 1968, while a student of Linacre College. In 1971 he received his doctorate in microbiology; his thesis was "The Replication of Some Iridescent Viruses in Cell Cultures". In the early 1970s he undertook postdoctoral research at the University of Warwick, before moving back to Oxford in the mid-1970s to work at the Institute of Virology and Environmental Microbiology. (Note: The Institute of Virology was later amalgamated by the Natural Environment Research Council.) There he carried out virology research into pests such as Spodoptera and Aedes. He rose to the position of chief scientific officer; much of his work was in the field of insect viruses.

=== Porton Down, Russia and Iraq: 1984–2003 ===
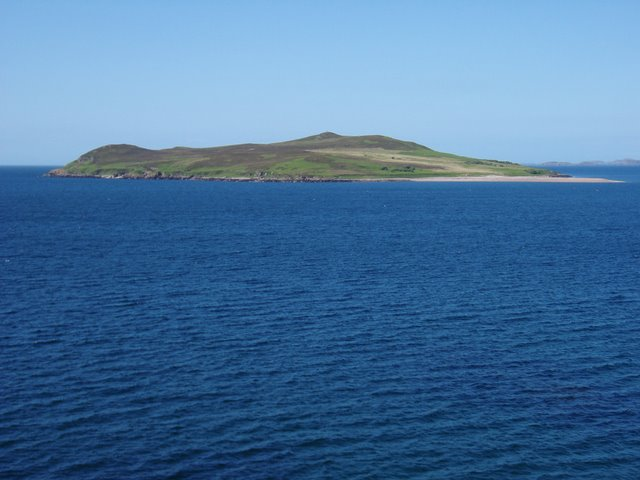
Gruinard Island, which Kelly assisted with decontaminating from weaponised anthrax

In 1984 Kelly joined the Ministry of Defence (MoD) as the head of the Defence Microbiology Division working at Porton Down, Wiltshire. (Note: Kelly's employment record was, in the opinion Lord Hutton, in the report to his inquiry, "somewhat complex". In April 1995 the Defence Evaluation and Research Agency (DERA) was established as an agency of the MoD; Kelly's personnel management was passed to the new organisation. The following year he was seconded back to the MoD as part of the Proliferation and Arms Control Secretariat; as part of the role he was an advisor to the Non-Proliferation Department, which was part of the Foreign and Commonwealth Office. It was through the FCO that Kelly undertook his role on the UN inspection teams. He also acted as an advisor to the DIS and the Secret Intelligence Service (MI6). In 2001, with a further re-organisation of the UK's defence establishment, Kelly's personnel management was moved to the Defence Science and Technology Laboratory, who was his formal employer until 2003, although he was still on secondment to the MoD.) The department had only a small number of microbiologists when he arrived, and most of their work involved the decontamination of Gruinard Island, which had been used during the Second World War for experiments with weaponised anthrax. He increased the scope of his department, obtaining additional funding to undertake research into biodefence. Because of the work undertaken by Kelly and his team, the UK were able to deploy a biodefence capability during the 1990–1991 Gulf War.

==== Russia: 1991–1994 ====
In 1989 Vladimir Pasechnik, the senior Soviet biologist and bioweapons developer, defected to the UK and provided intelligence about the clandestine biological warfare (BW) programme, Biopreparat. The programme was in contravention of the 1972 Biological Weapons Convention which banned the production of chemical and biological weapons. (Note: The full title is the "Convention on the Prohibition of the Development, Production and Stockpiling of Bacteriological (Biological) and Toxin Weapons and on Their Destruction". This banned the development, production and stockpiling of weapons of mass destruction.) Pasechnik was debriefed by the Defence Intelligence Staff (DIS), who requested technical assistance to process the information on chemical and biological matters; Kelly was seconded to the DIS to assist with his colleagues Brian Jones and Christopher Davis. They debriefed Pasechnik over a period of three years.

Kelly undertook several visits to Russia between 1991 and 1994 as the co-lead of a team from the UK and US which inspected civilian biotechnology facilities in Russia. One of the restrictions placed on the inspectors was that visits could only be to non-military installations, so, for the first visit in January 1991, the team visited the Institute of Engineering Immunology, in Lyubuchany; the State Research Centre for Applied Microbiology in Obolensk; the Vector State Research Center of Virology and Biotechnology in Koltsovo; and the Institute of Ultrapure Preparations, in Leningrad (now Saint Petersburg). The Russians obstructed the team and tried to stop inspection of key areas of the facilities; they also lied about the use to which parts of the installations were put. On one visit to the Vector facility, Kelly had a conversation with a laboratory assistant—one who was too low grade to have been fully briefed by the KGB. Kelly asked the assistant about the work he was doing, and was surprised when the man said he was involved in testing smallpox. Kelly questioned Lev Sandakchiev, the head of Vector, about the use of smallpox, but received no answers. Kelly described the questioning sessions as "a very tense moment".

In a 2002 review of the verification process, Kelly wrote:

The visits did not go without incident. At Obolensk, access to parts of the main research facility—notably the dynamic aerosol test chambers and the plague research laboratories—was denied on the spurious grounds of quarantine requirements. Skirmishes occurred over access to an explosive aerosol chamber because the officials knew that closer examination would reveal damning evidence of offensive BW activities. At Koltsova access was again difficult and problematic. The most serious incident was when senior officials contradicted an admission by technical staff that research on smallpox was being conducted there. The officials were unable to properly account for the presence of smallpox and for the research being undertaken in a dynamic aerosol test chamber on orthopoxvirus, which was capable of explosive dispersal. At the Institute of Ultrapure Preparations in Leningrad (Pasechnik's former workplace), dynamic and explosive test chambers were passed off as being for agricultural projects, contained milling machines were described as being for the grinding of salt, and studies on plague, especially production of the agent, were misrepresented. Candid and credible accounts of many of the activities at these facilities were not provided.

Two official reports of the visit concluded that Soviets were running a covert and illegal BW programme. Kelly also took part in reciprocal visits to the United States Army Medical Research Institute of Infectious Diseases at Fort Detrick, Maryland, and visits to Porton Down by Russian and American inspectors. Despite their findings, Kelly concluded that the tripartite inspection programme had failed. It was, he said, "too ambitious; its disarmament objective deflected by issues of reciprocity and access to sites outside the territories of the three parties". He went on to add that "Russia's refusal to provide a complete account of its past and current BW activity and the inability of the American–British teams to gain access to Soviet/Russian military industrial facilities were significant contributory factors".

==== Appointment to UNSCOM ====
Following the end of the Gulf War, United Nations Security Council Resolution 687 imposed the articles of Iraq's surrender. The document stated "that Iraq shall unconditionally accept the destruction, removal, or rendering harmless, under international supervision, of ... All chemical and biological weapons". This was to be made possible by "The forming of a special commission which shall carry out immediate on-site inspection of Iraq's biological, chemical and missile capabilities, based on Iraq's declarations and the designation of any additional locations by the special commission itself". The group set up was the United Nations Special Commission (UNSCOM), and Kelly was appointed to it in 1991 as one of its chief weapons inspectors in Iraq. The Iraqis had provided Rolf Ekéus, the director of UNSCOM, with a list of sites connected with the research and production of weapons of mass destruction (WMD) in the country, about half of which had been bombed during Operation Desert Storm. These sites provided the starting point for the investigations. In August 1991 Kelly led the first group of UN BW investigators into the country. When asked where the inspection teams would visit, he told reporters "We will go to sites which we deem to have characteristics associated with biological activity, but at the moment ... I have an open mind." The first UNSCOM missions finished with no evidence found of an Iraqi biological or chemical programme, although they did establish that some sites suspected by US intelligence services of involvement in biological or chemical warfare research were legitimate. These included a bakery, a pharmaceutical research business in Samarra, a dairy and a slaughterhouse.

UNSCOM undertook 261 inspection missions to Iraq between May 1991 and December 1998, 74 of which were for biological weapons. (Note: The remaining visits were nuclear and ballistic missile inspections.) Kelly led ten of the missions involved in BW inspections. In 1998 and 1999 Iraq refused to deal with UNSCOM or the inspectors; the country's president, Saddam Hussein, singled out Kelly by name for expulsion from the country. During an inspection mission to Iraq in 1998, Kelly worked alongside an American translator and US Air Force officer, Mai Pederson, who introduced him to the Baháʼí Faith. Kelly remained a member of the faith for the rest of his life, attending spiritual meetings near his home of Southmoor, Oxfordshire. He was, for a time, the treasurer of his local branch, based in Abingdon, Oxfordshire. His time in Iraq left him with a deep affection for the country, its people and culture, although he abhorred Saddam's government.

==== British dossier on Iraqi WMD ====
In 2000 UNSCOM was replaced by the United Nations Monitoring, Verification and Inspection Commission (UNMOVIC), whose mission and aims were similar to that of UNSCOM: to remove Iraqi WMDs and "to operate a system of ongoing monitoring and verification to check Iraq's compliance with its obligations not to reacquire the same weapons prohibited to it by the Security Council".

Kelly returned to work as a government advisor with the MoD on biological warfare, but also worked with UNMOVIC and continued to visit Iraq. He was involved in at least 36 missions to Iraq as part of UNSCOM and UNMOVIC, (Note: The number of Kelly's visits to Iraq varies. Germ Warfare: Dr Kelly's Last Interview, a Channel 5 documentary broadcast in 2004, states it was 36 visits; Lord Hutton, in the report to his inquiry, says 37 visits, as does Tom Mangold, in Kelly's biography in the Dictionary of National Biography; and Robert Lewis, in his biography of Kelly, states Kelly made 38 visits.) and, despite interference and obstruction tactics by the Iraqis, was instrumental in making the breakthrough to discover Iraq's BW facilities: the anthrax production programme at the Salman Pak facility and a BW programme run at Al Hakum.

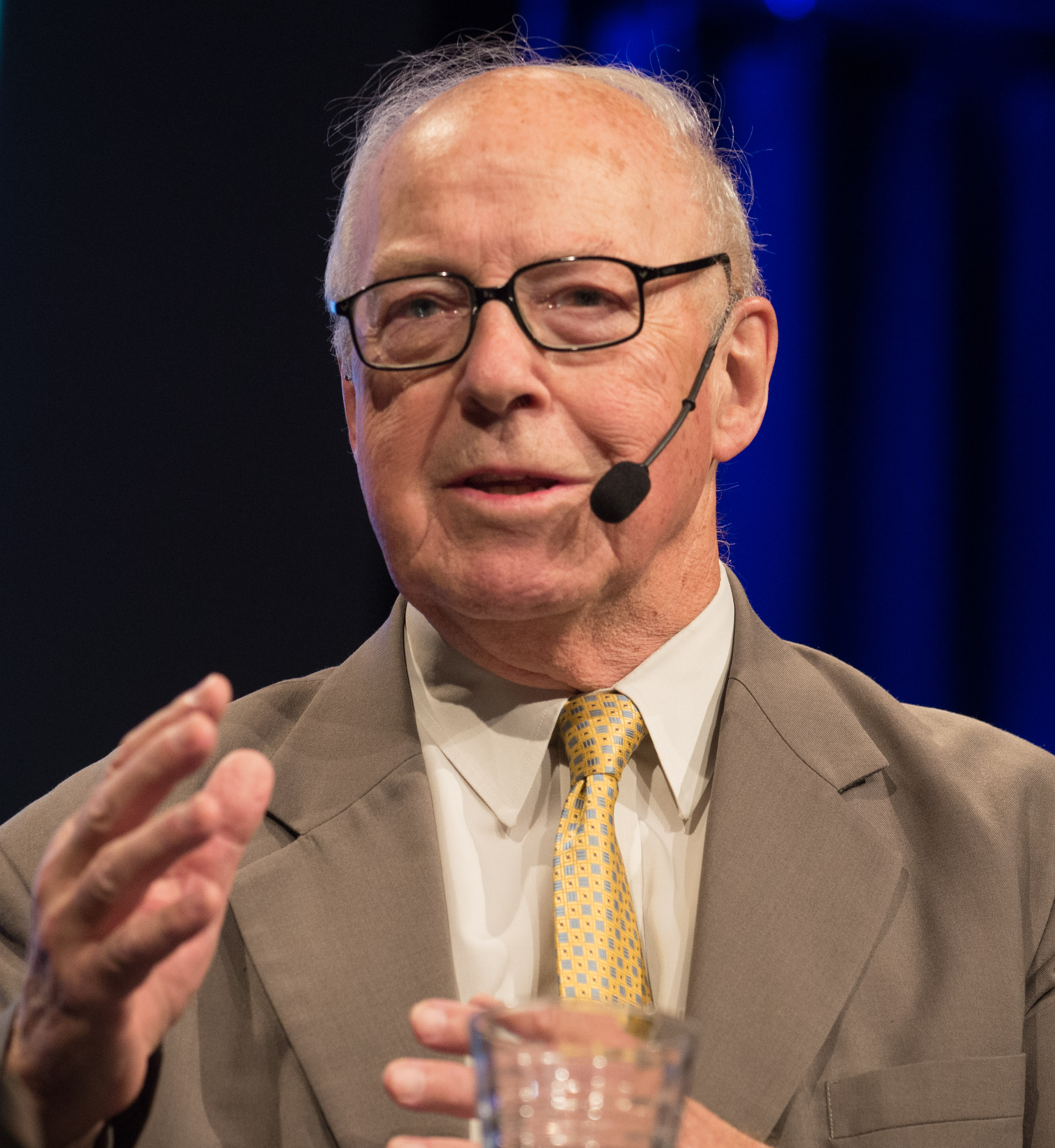
Hans Blix, the head of UNMOVIC from March 2000 to June 2003

In his 2002 State of the Union address, George W. Bush, the president of the United States, discussed the use of WMD by the Iraqi regime. Later that year he reaffirmed that "the stated policy of the United States is regime change". As part of the British government's arguments for war on Saddam, Tony Blair, the British Prime Minister, instructed the publication of a dossier on Iraqi WMD on 24 September 2002. (Note: The dossier, "Iraq's Weapons of Mass Destruction: The Assessment of the British Government" became known as the "September Dossier". A briefing paper, "Iraq – Its Infrastructure of Concealment, Deception and Intimidation" was published in February 2003; this became known as the February, or Dodgy, Dossier. It later transpired that this document was plagiarised from "Iraq's Security and Intelligence Network: A Guide and Analysis", an article by Ibrahim al-Marashi, published in September 2002 in the Middle East Review of International Affairs. The February Dossier made no mention of the 45-minute claim.) The dossier, which was "based, in large part, on the work of the Joint Intelligence Committee (JIC)", included the statement that the Iraqi government had:

- continued to produce chemical and biological agents;
- military plans for the use of chemical and biological weapons, including against its own Shia population. Some of these weapons are deployable within 45 minutes of an order to use them;
- command and control arrangements in place to use chemical and biological weapons. Authority ultimately resides with Saddam Hussein.

Before its publication, Kelly had been shown a draft copy of the dossier and took part in a meeting at the DIS to review it. Four pages of comments were made regarding the information in the report, of which Kelly contributed twelve individual statements. The observations from the DIS were passed up to the Joint Intelligence Organisation; none of the observations referred to the 45-minute claim.

On 8 November 2002 the UN Security Council passed Resolution 1441, "a final opportunity to comply with its disarmament obligations under relevant resolutions of the Council; and accordingly decides to set up an enhanced inspection regime with the aim of bringing to full and verified completion the disarmament process". The resolution stated that the Iraqi government needed to provide full details of its WMD programme within 30 days. (Note: Point 3 of the resolution states that the Iraqi government need to "provide to UNMOVIC, the IAEA, and the Council, not later than 30 days from the date of this resolution, a currently accurate, full, and complete declaration of all aspects of its programmes to develop chemical, biological, and nuclear weapons, ballistic missiles, and other delivery systems such as unmanned aerial vehicles and dispersal systems designed for use on aircraft, including any holdings and precise locations of such weapons, components, subcomponents, stocks of agents, and related material and equipment, the locations and work of its research, development and production facilities, as well as all other chemical, biological, and nuclear programmes, including any which it claims are for purposes not related to weapon production or material.") As a result of the increasing pressure on the Iraqi government, UNSCOM inspectors were readmitted to the country and were provided information on the Iraqi WMD programme. According to Kelly, despite the steps taken, Saddam "refuse[d] to acknowledge the extent of his chemical and biological weapons and associated military and industrial support organisations", and there was still a concern about "8,500 litres of anthrax VX, [sic] 2,160 kilograms of bacterial growth media, 360 tonnes of bulk chemical warfare agent, 6,500 chemical bombs and 30,000 munitions capable of delivering chemical and biological warfare agents [which] remained unaccounted for from activities up to 1991".

==== Interaction with journalists ====
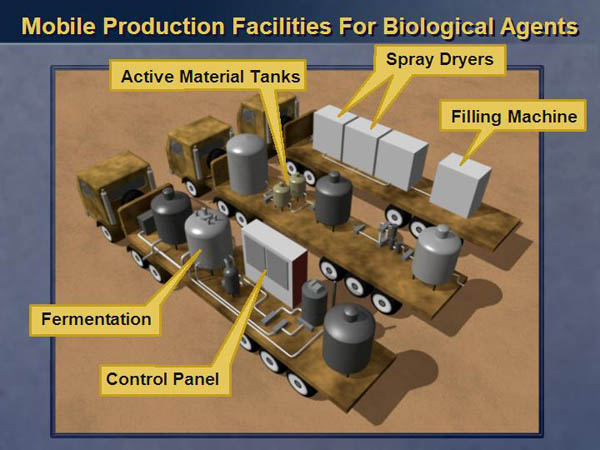
Purported Iraqi mobile weapons laboratories, actually for production of hydrogen to fill weather balloons

In February 2003 Colin Powell, the US Secretary of State, addressed the United Nations Security Council to discuss Iraq's WMD. He included information on mobile weapons laboratories, which he described as "trucks and train cars ... easily moved and ... designed to evade detection by inspectors. In a matter of months, they can produce a quantity of biological poison equal to the entire amount that Iraq claimed to have produced in the years prior to the Gulf War." Following his examination of the vehicles in question, Kelly spoke, off the record, to journalists from The Observer. In their article in the newspaper on 15 June 2003 they described him as "a British scientist and biological weapons expert", and quoted him as saying:

They are not mobile germ warfare laboratories. You could not use them for making biological weapons. They do not even look like them. They are exactly what the Iraqis said they were—facilities for the production of hydrogen gas to fill balloons.

One of the journalists who wrote the story, Peter Beaumont, confirmed to the Hutton Inquiry that Kelly was the source of this quote. Kelly was often approached by the press and would either clear the discussion with the press office of the FCO, or use his judgement before doing so; it was within his remit to liaise with the media. (Note: Between April 2002 and March 2003, Kelly's personnel file recorded that in addition to speaking at numerous seminars and conferences, he had given briefings on an attributable and unattributable basis concerning Iraq, Russia, weapons, anthrax and smallpox. These were to: Television and radio: Channel 4, Australian Broadcasting Company, Canadian Broadcasting Corporation, Tokyo Broadcasting System, CNN, CBS, ABC, Radio Netherlands, BBC Four, BBC News 24/World Service and BBC Local Radio (London, Wales).; News media: The Guardian, The Daily Telegraph, The Times, The New York Times, The Washington Post, Los Angeles Times, Newsweek, The Herald Tribune and The Wall Street Journal.) Shortly before the 2003 invasion of Iraq (20 March – 1 May 2003) Kelly anonymously wrote an article on the threat from Saddam which was never published. He outlined his thoughts on the build-up to war:

Iraq has spent the past 30 years building up an arsenal of weapons of mass destruction (WMD). Although the current threat presented by Iraq militarily is modest, both in terms of conventional and unconventional weapons, it has never given up its intent to develop and stockpile such weapons for both military and terrorist use.

He continued that "The long-term threat, however, remains Iraq's development to military maturity of weapons of mass destruction—something that only regime change will avert." On 20 March 2003 British and American troops entered Iraq to bring about the regime change. Most of the country was occupied and Saddam was overthrown within four weeks; Bush stated that war was over on 1 May 2003. On 7 May 2003 Kelly was telephoned by Susan Watts, the science editor of the BBC's Newsnight programme; the call lasted 15 to 20 minutes. They discussed various matters relating to Iraq including, towards the end of the conversation, the matter of the 45-minute claim. Watts's handwritten shorthand notes showed Kelly stated the claim was "a mistake to put in. Alastair Campbell seeing something in there, single source but not corroborated, sounded good." (Note: The quote was Watts reading from her shorthand copy, which reads "..a mistake to put in..A Campbell seeing something in there... NB single source. but not corroborated..sounded good.") The pair also had a subsequent call on 12 May. Kelly flew to Kuwait on 19 May as part of a military team. He hoped to meet members of the Iraq Survey Group to see how the organisation worked. When he arrived in Kuwait he found that no visa had been arranged for him, so he returned home.

==== Contact with Andrew Gilligan ====
Two BBC journalists with whom Kelly was in contact over the 45-minute claim

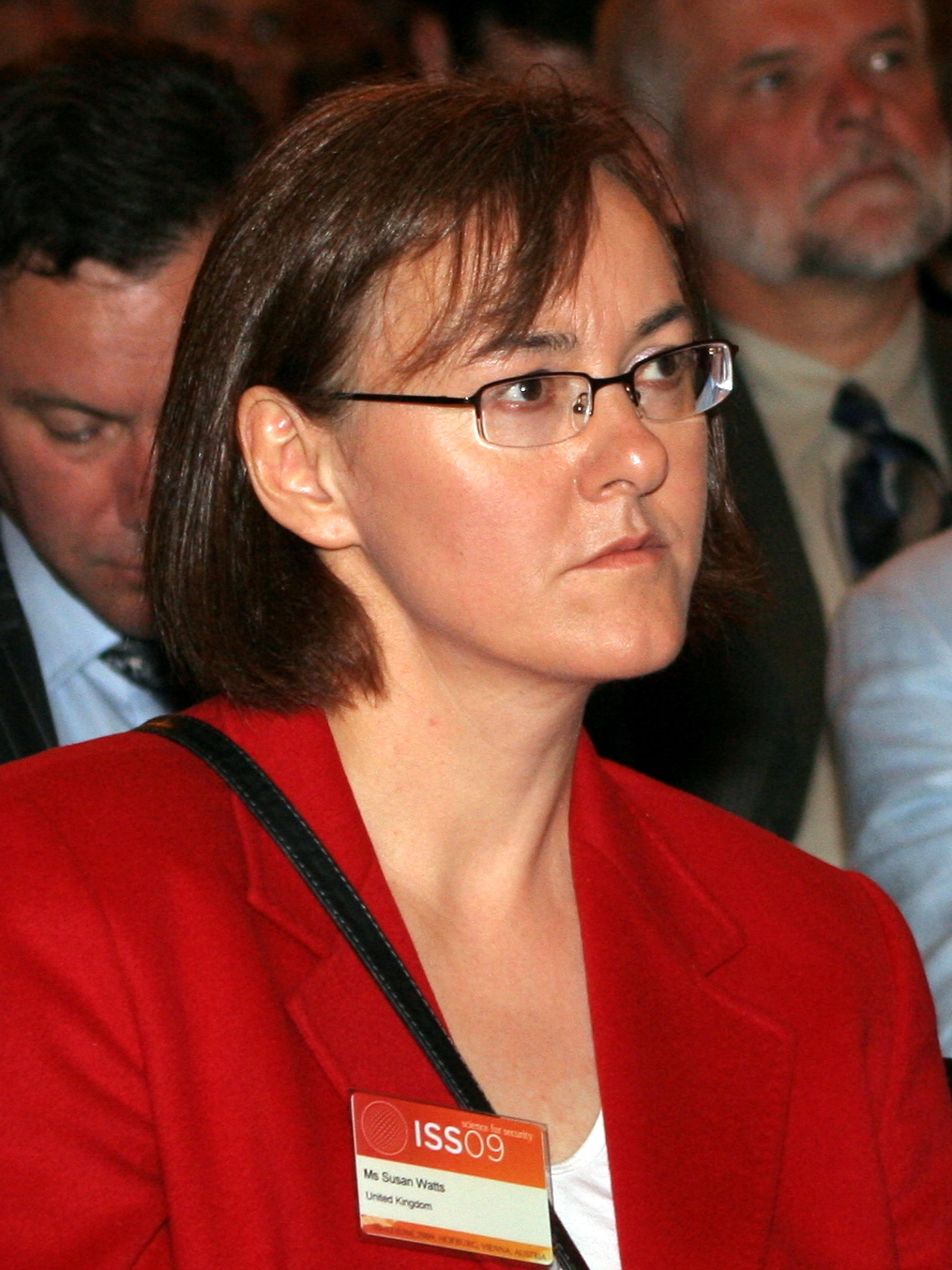
Susan Watts, the science editor of the BBC's Newsnight programme

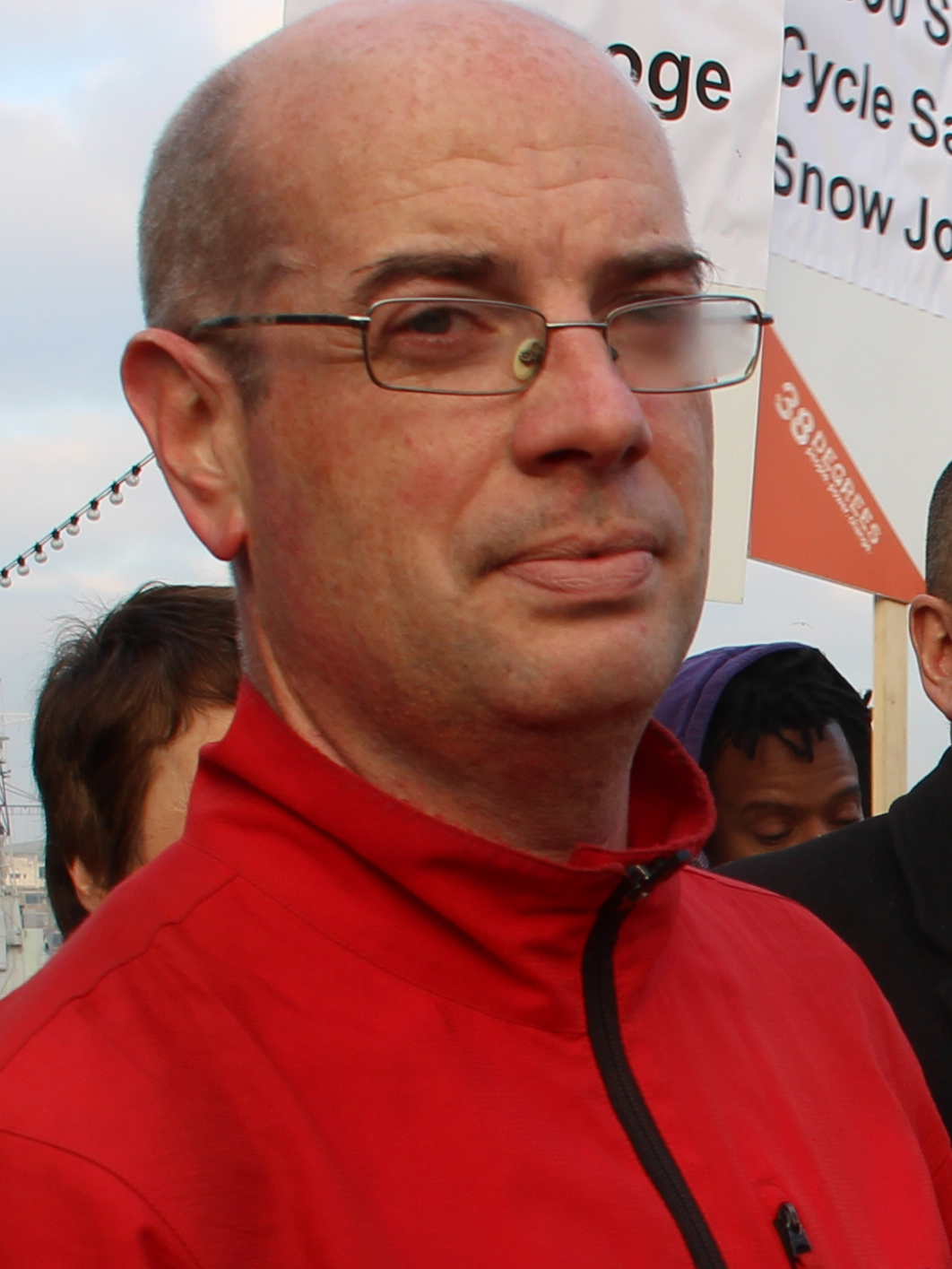
Andrew Gilligan, the Defence and Diplomatic Correspondent for BBC Radio 4's Today programme

On 22 May 2003 Kelly met Andrew Gilligan, the Defence and Diplomatic Correspondent for BBC Radio 4's Today programme, at the Charing Cross Hotel, London. It was the third time the pair had met. The meeting, initiated by Gilligan, was for the journalist to ask why Kelly thought WMDs had not been discovered in Iraq by the British and American troops. According to Gilligan, after 30 minutes the conversation focussed on the September Dossier and how key areas of the document were altered to give greater impact to the public. Gilligan took notes on an electronic organiser; he said these read as

Transformed week before publication to make it sexier. The classic was the 45 minutes. Most things in dossier were double source but that was single source. One source said it took 4 [that should be 45] minutes to set up a missile assembly, that was misinterpreted. Most people in intelligence weren't happy with it because it didn't reflect the considered view they were putting forward. Campbell: real information but unreliable, included against our wishes. Not in original draft - dull, he asked if anything else could go in. (Note: Gilligan's electronic notes read: "transformed wk before pub to make it sexier the classic was the 45 mins. mst thngs inndossier wre dbl sc but that was single-source, one source said it took 4 minutes to set up a missile assembly, that was misinterpreted. . most people in intel werent happy with it, beause it didnt refect the considere view they were putting forward campbell real info but unr, incl agaisnt ur wishes not in orig draft – dull, he asked ifanything else cd go in)

Soon after the meeting, Gilligan claimed, he wrote a full script of the interview, based on his memory and notes. Between the completion of the document and the start of the Hutton Inquiry in August, Gilligan says he lost that script. Kelly was in New York on 29 May 2003, attending the final commissioners' meeting of UNMOVIC under the leadership of Hans Blix. At 6.07 that morning, on the Today programme, Gilligan explained to the programme's host, John Humphrys, what he would be discussing later in the programme:

what we've been told by one of the senior officials in charge of drawing up that dossier was that, actually the government probably erm, knew that that forty five minute figure was wrong, even before it decided to put it in. What this person says, is that a week before the publication date of the dossier, it was actually rather erm, a bland production. It didn't, the, the draft prepared for Mr Blair by the Intelligence Agencies actually didn't say very much more than was public knowledge already and erm, Downing Street, our source says, ordered a week before publication, ordered it to be sexed up, to be made more exciting and ordered more facts to be er, to be discovered.

Gilligan had not been able to get confirmation from any other sources about the veracity of the claim. The producer of Today, Kevin Marsh, writes that Gilligan went off his pre-prepared script. With news based on an anonymous single source, stories "have to be reported word perfectly" to be precise about the meaning; according to Marsh, "Gilligan had lost control of that precision". Downing Street had not been forewarned of the story, or been contacted to ask for a statement. At 7:32 am the government press office issued a statement to refute the story: "Not one word of the dossier was not entirely the work of the intelligence agencies". Gilligan then broadcast a report for the BBC Radio 5 Live Breakfast programme in which he repeated the claim that the government had inserted the 45-minute claim into the dossier. Kelly did not recognise himself from Gilligan's description of a "senior official in charge of drawing up the document"; Kelly had taken no part in drafting the document and had only been asked for comments on the contents.

The following day Watts telephoned Kelly at home to discuss the quotes on the Today programme; she recorded the call. When she asked him if he was being questioned about the identity of the source, Kelly replied "I mean they wouldn't think it was me, I don't think. Maybe they would, maybe they wouldn't. I don't know." Their conversation also included the possible involvement of Campbell in the inclusion of the 45-minute claim in the dossier:

SW OK just back momentarily on the 45 minute issue I'm feeling like I ought to just explore that a little bit more with you the um err. So would it be accurate then, as you did in that earlier conversation, to say that it was Alastair Campbell himself who...
DK No I can't. All I can say is the Number Ten press office. I've never met Alastair Campbell so I can't ... But I think Alastair Campbell is synonymous with that press office because he's responsible for it.

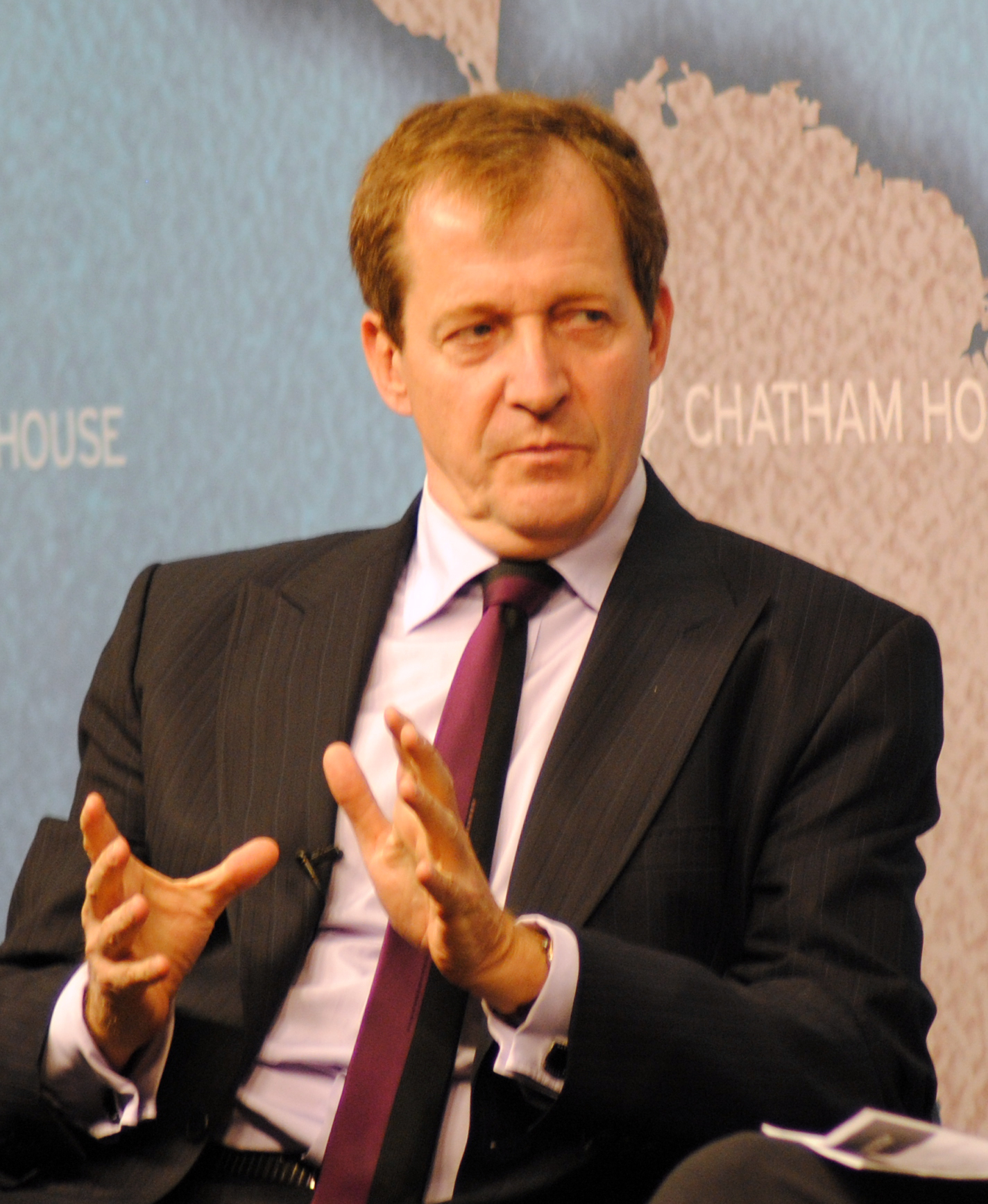
Alastair Campbell, who, Gilligan asserted, had included the 45-minute claim in the 2002 September Dossier

Despite the denial from the government, on 1 June—the day after Kelly and Watts had spoken on the telephone—Gilligan wrote an article for The Mail on Sunday in which he specifically named Campbell; it was titled: "I asked my intelligence source why Blair misled us all over Saddam's weapons. His reply? One word ... CAMPBELL". According to the journalist Miles Goslett, the report on the Today programme "caused little more than a ripple" of interest; the newspaper article "was of major international significance. It was career-threatening for all concerned if substantiated."

As political tumult between Downing Street and the BBC developed, Kelly alerted his line manager at the MoD, Bryan Wells, that he had met Gilligan and discussed, among other points, the 45-minute claim. In a detailed letter of 30 June, Kelly stated that any mention of Campbell had been raised by Gilligan, not himself, and that this was an aside. Kelly stated that "I did not even consider that I was the 'source' of Gilligan's information"; he only became aware of the possibility after Gilligan had appeared at the Foreign Affairs Select Committee on 19 June. Kelly said of Gilligan's evidence that "The description of that meeting in small part matches my interaction with him especially my personal evaluation of Iraq's capability but the overall character is quite different". In closing, he reiterated that "With hindsight I of course deeply regret talking to Andrew Gilligan even though I am convinced that I am not his primary source of information."

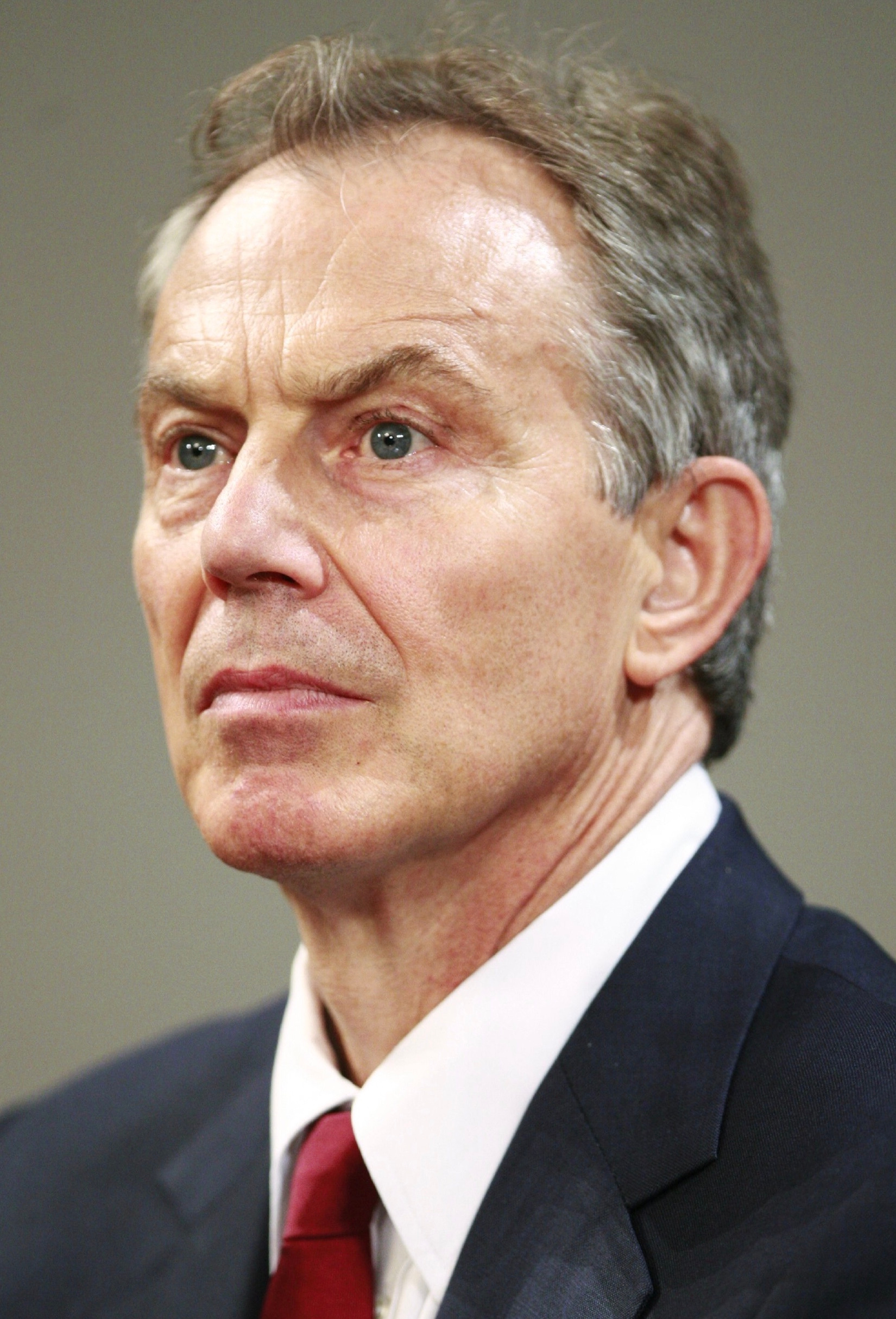
Tony Blair, the British Prime Minister who chaired the meeting that agreed to confirm Kelly's name to journalists if they guessed his identity

Kelly was interviewed twice by his employers—on 3 and 7 July; they concluded that he may have been Gilligan's source, but that Gilligan may have exaggerated what Kelly said. A decision was taken that no official action was to be taken against Kelly. He was also advised that, with journalists pressing for further information, it was possible his name would emerge in press reports. Reports in The Times by the journalist Tom Baldwin on 5 and 8 July gave significant hints on the identity of Gilligan's source. At a meeting chaired by Blair on 8 July it was agreed that a statement should be released that stated a member of the MoD had come forward to say that he was the source. It was also agreed that Kelly's name would not be released to journalists, but if someone guessed who it was, they were allowed to confirm it. Kevin Tebbit, the permanent secretary at the MoD—Kelly's ultimate superior at the department—arrived at the end of the meeting and was unable to provide any input. (Note: Norman Baker, the former member of parliament, in his history of Kelly's death, states that Tebbit had gone to great lengths to ensure that he "sought to apply proper procedures and protect Dr Kelly from the political circus". When asked about the decision of the meeting on the 8th, Tebbit said "I was not actually invited to challenge the judgement of a meeting that had been chaired by the Prime Minister".) At 5:54 pm on 8 July the government statement was released. Without naming Kelly, it said a member of the MoD had come forward to admit that he had met Gilligan at an unauthorised meeting a week before Gilligan's broadcast. The statement said that this MoD employee was not in a position to comment on Campbell's role in the 45 minute issue as he had not helped draw up the intelligence report and had not seen it. At 5:50 pm the following day a journalist from The Financial Times guessed Kelly's name correctly; a journalist from The Times did so soon afterwards after nineteen failed guesses.

On the evening of 8 July Nick Rufford, a journalist with The Sunday Times who had known Kelly for five years, visited him at home in Southmoor. Rufford told him that his name would be published in the papers the following day. He advised Kelly to leave his home that night to avoid the media, and said the newspaper would put Kelly and his wife up at a hotel. Soon after Rufford left he contacted the MoD and asked if Kelly could write a piece for the paper putting forward his version of events; the MoD press office said this was unlikely. Soon afterwards the MoD phoned Kelly and advised him to find somewhere else to stay the night. According to Mrs Kelly, the couple left the house within 15 minutes and drove to Cornwall, breaking the journey overnight in Weston-super-Mare, Somerset, where they arrived by 9:45 pm. Although the trip to Cornwall was described by Mrs Kelly at the Hutton Inquiry, Baker considers that there are "problems with the version of events we are asked to accept"; Goslett writes that Kelly played cribbage with a pub team in Kingston Bagpuize that night and was there until at least 10:30 pm. None of those on Kelly's cribbage team were asked to give evidence to the Hutton Inquiry.

While in Cornwall, on the morning of 11 July, Kelly had a telephone call from Bryan Wells to tell him that he would have to appear in front of the Intelligence and Security and Foreign Affairs select committees. He was told that the latter of these would be televised, something that upset him greatly, according to his wife. That afternoon, still unhappy with the news from the earlier phone call, he spoke to Wells again nine times. They agreed to meet on Monday 14 July to prepare for the interviews. Kelly returned from Cornwall on 13 July and stayed in Oxford at his daughter Rachel's house.

==== Appearance before House of Commons committees ====
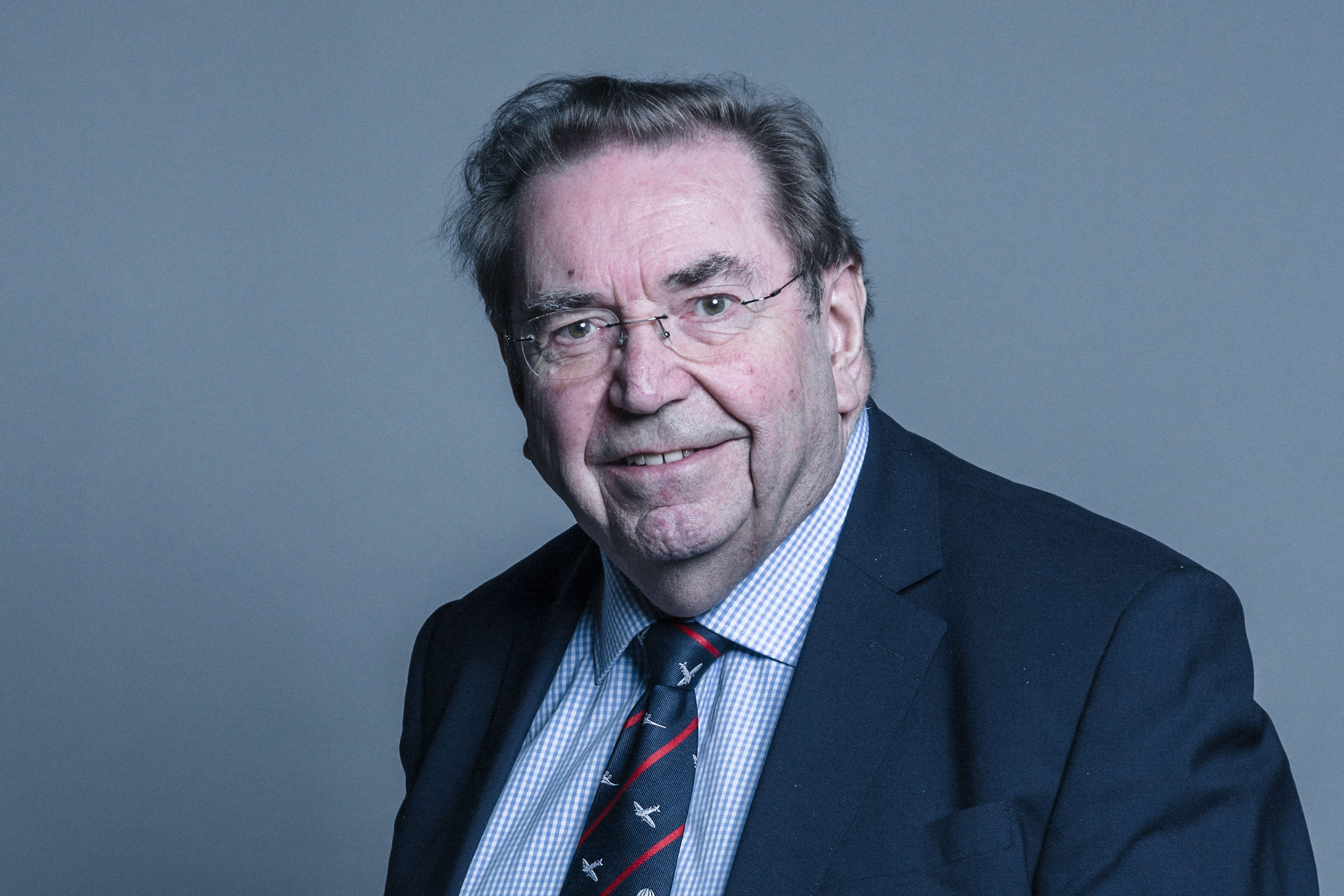
David Chidgey, who put questions to Kelly that had been provided by Gilligan

Kelly's appearance before the Foreign Affairs Select Committee was against the advice of Tebbit, the most senior civil servant at the MoD. He had been overruled by Geoff Hoon, the secretary of state for defence. Kelly appeared in front of the committee on 15 July in a session that lasted over an hour. He spoke so softly the fans in the room were turned off so the committee members could hear him reply; according to Baker, "Every word [from Kelly] was weighed carefully and some painful circumlocutions resulted." Kelly told the committee that he had met Gilligan but, as the journalist Tom Mangold, in Kelly's biography in the Dictionary of National Biography writes, "denied that he had said the things Gilligan reported his source as having said".

Kelly was questioned by the Liberal Democrat MP David Chidgey about conversations with Susan Watts. It was the first time her name had been connected with Kelly in public, and it was later established that Gilligan had not only sent Chidgey excerpts from a recorded conversation, but also gave Chidgey questions to ask Kelly. The quote included Kelly's opinion on the 45 minute claim. The quote read out by Chidgey included: "The 45 minutes was a statement that was made and it got out of all proportion. They were desperate for information. They were pushing hard for information that could be released. That was one that popped up and it was seized on and it is unfortunate that it was." Chidgey asked Kelly if the quotes came from the meeting he had with Watts in November 2002—the only time the pair had met face-to-face; Kelly replied that "I cannot believe that on that occasion I made that statement." According to Goslett, this was a truthful statement, as Kelly had not made the statement in November 2002, but on 30 May that year. Mangold notes that Kelly appeared to be under stress during the interview, and that some of the questioning was overtly hostile. One Labour MP, Andrew MacKinlay, questioned Kelly towards the end of the session:

Andrew MacKinlay: I reckon you are chaff; you have been thrown up to divert our probing. Have you ever felt like a fall-guy? You have been set up, have you not?

Dr Kelly: That is not a question I can answer.

Andrew MacKinlay: But you feel that?

Dr Kelly: No, not at all. I accept the process that is going on.

After the hearing Kelly described MacKinlay to his daughter as an "utter bastard".

On the following day, 16 July 2003, Kelly gave evidence to the Intelligence and Security Committee. He appeared more relaxed than he had in front of the Foreign Affairs Committee, according to Baker. When asked, Kelly described the September dossier as "an accurate document, I think it is a fair reflection of the intelligence that was available and it's presented in a very sober and factual way."

=== Death: 17 July 2003 ===
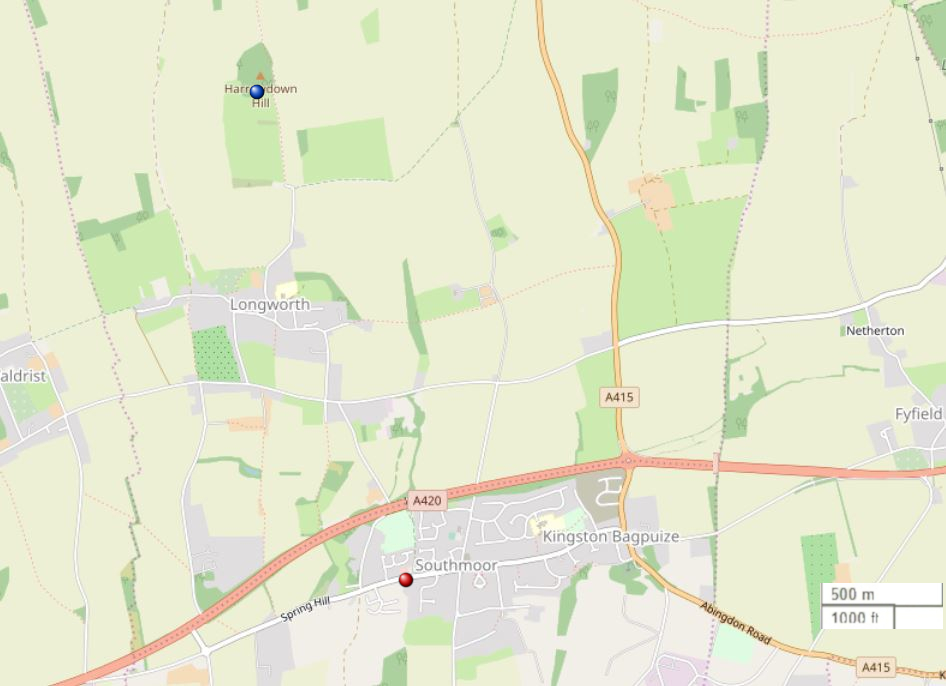
Key points in the life of David Kelly: – Southmoor, where he lived – Harrowdown Hill, where his body was found. Both locations are in Oxfordshire.

On the morning of 17 July Kelly worked from his home in Southmoor, answering written parliamentary questions from two MPs—MacKinlay on the identity of the journalists Kelly had spoken to, and the Conservative MP Bernard Jenkin on Kelly's discussions with Gilligan and whether he would be disciplined for it; Kelly had to provide the information to the MoD to forward on. He had a telephone call with Wing Commander John Clark, a friend and colleague, during which they discussed the general situation Kelly was in, as well as a trip to Iraq on which Kelly was due to go in the following week. Clark reported that Kelly seemed to be "very tired, but in good spirits". He had received several emails from well-wishers, including from The New York Times journalist Judith Miller, to which he replied "I will wait until the end of the week before judging—many dark actors playing games. Thanks for your support."

During the course of the day Kelly received a phone call that changed his mood. Mangold states that "[the] most likely explanation is that he learned from a well-meaning friend at the Ministry of Defence that the BBC had tape-recorded evidence which, when published, would show that he had indeed said the things to Susan Watts that he had formally denied saying." Mrs Kelly was ill that day and spent some time lying down in the couple's bedroom, but she got up at 3:00 pm to find Kelly speaking on the phone, before she returned to her bedroom to sleep. Goslett thinks this phone call is likely to have been with Clark, in a discussion about one of the answers to the parliamentary questions. Kelly left for a walk between 3:00 and 3:20 pm and was last seen by Ruth Absalom, a neighbour, with whom he stopped to have a chat. She was the last person known to have seen him alive. Clark tried to contact Kelly at home—where Mrs Kelly told him that her husband had gone for a walk—and then on Kelly's mobile, which was switched off; Clark stated he was surprised it was off as Kelly was normally easily contactable.

As far as it is known, Kelly walked a mile (1.6 km) from his house to Harrowdown Hill. It appears he ingested up to 29 tablets of co-proxamol, an analgesic drug; he also cut his left wrist with a pruning knife he had owned since his youth, severing his ulnar artery. Forensic analysis established that neither the knife nor the blister packs showed Kelly's fingerprints on their surfaces.

Harrowdown Hill, site of Kelly's death

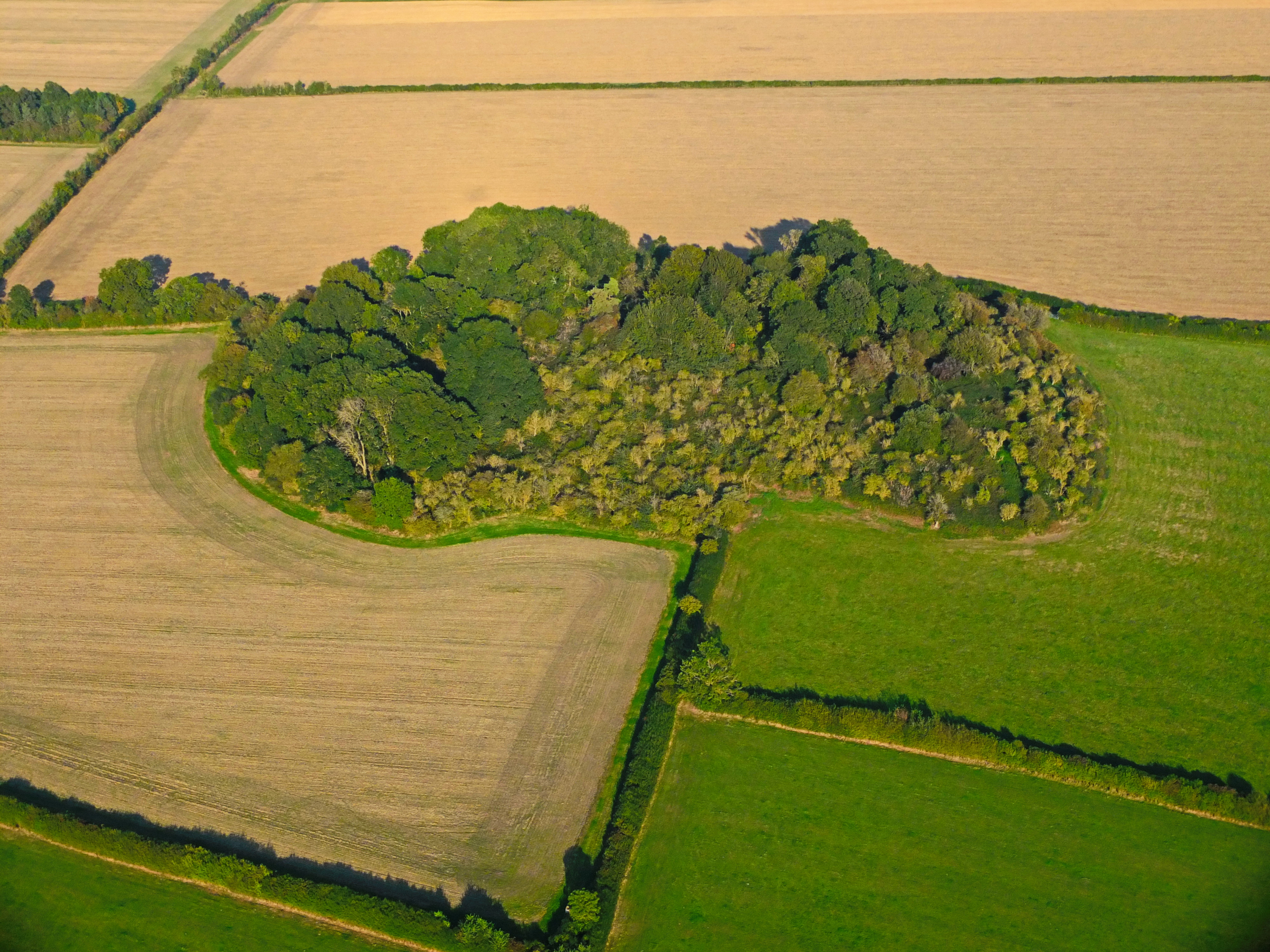
Aerial view of Harrowdown Hill

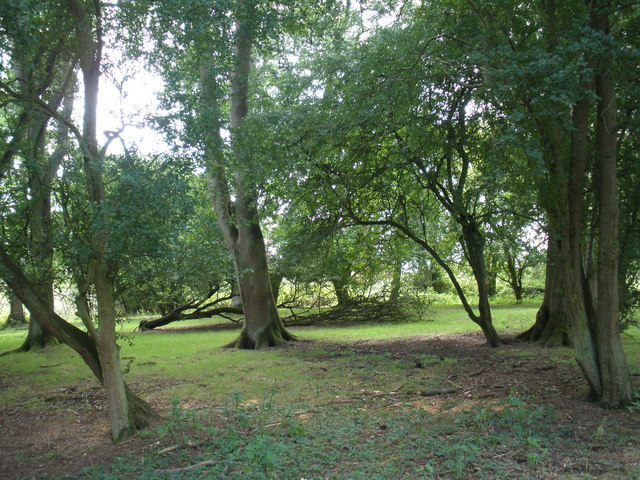
Woods on Harrowdown Hill; Kelly's body was found near this spot

Rachel Kelly spoke to her mother in the late afternoon, then drove to her parents' house at around 6:00 pm. As her father had not returned, Rachel walked a route along a footpath her father was known to use regularly to try and find him; she returned to the house at around 6:30 pm, then drove round to see if she could find anything. Sian, the Kellys' eldest daughter, also came to the house that night, and at 11:40 pm they phoned the police. Three officers from the local station in Abingdon arrived within 15 minutes; they searched the house and garden straight away. By 1:00 am a search helicopter from RAF Benson, fitted with thermal imaging equipment, had been requested; teams of search dogs were also provided and a 26-metre (85 ft) communications mast was erected, as the Kellys' home was in a mobile communications black spot.

The police used volunteer search teams, and it was one of these that found Kelly's body on Harrowdown Hill at about 9:20 am on 18 July. The two-person team differed in their description of the position of the body: one stated Kelly was "at the base of the tree with almost his head and his shoulders just slumped back against the tree"; the other stated Kelly was "sitting with his back up against a tree". The police and paramedics differed from both the searchers. DC Coe, one of the first policemen at the scene, stated the body "was laying on its back—the body was laying on its back by a large tree, the head towards the trunk of the tree"; the pathologist called to the scene, Nicholas Hunt, recalled that: "his head was quite close to branches and so forth, but not actually over the tree."

== Immediate aftermath ==
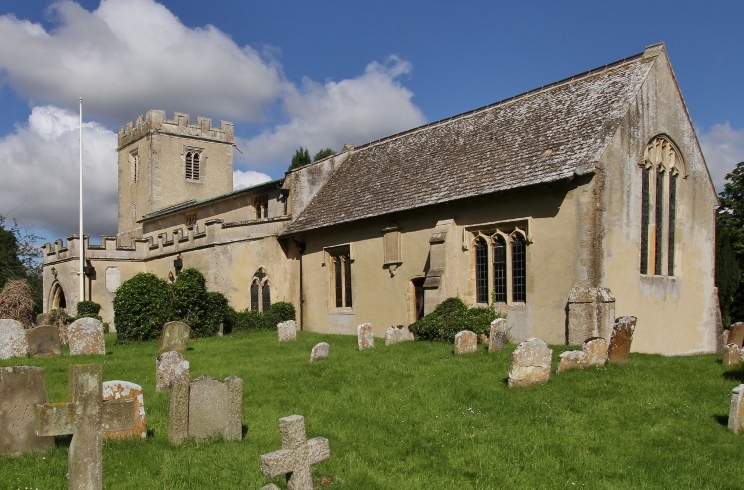
St Mary's Church, Longworth, where Kelly was buried

Blair was on an aeroplane from Washington to Tokyo when the body was found. He was contacted while en route and informed of the news, although Kelly had not been formally identified at that stage. He decided to order a judicial inquiry to examine the circumstances, which was to be headed by Lord Hutton, a former Lord Chief Justice of Northern Ireland. His terms of reference were "urgently to conduct an investigation into the circumstances surrounding the death of Dr Kelly".

Hunt undertook the post-mortem examination on 19 July in the presence of eight police officers and two members of the coroner's office. Hunt concluded that the cause of death was a haemorrhage caused by a self-inflicted injury from "incised wounds to the left wrist", with the contributory factors of "co-proxamol ingestion and coronary artery atherosclerosis". On 20 July 2003, the day after the post-mortem, the BBC confirmed that Kelly was their only source. Nicholas Gardner, the coroner, opened and adjourned his inquest on 21 July, noting that the pathologist was still awaiting the toxicology report. With the establishment of the inquiry under Hutton, the Lord Chancellor's Department contacted Nicholas Gardner, the coroner, to advise him that under section 17A of the Coroners Act 1988, the coroner's inquest should only be resumed if there were exceptional circumstances to do so.

On 6 August 2003, five days after the preliminary session of the Hutton Inquiry, Kelly was buried at St Mary's Church, Longworth.

== Hutton Inquiry ==
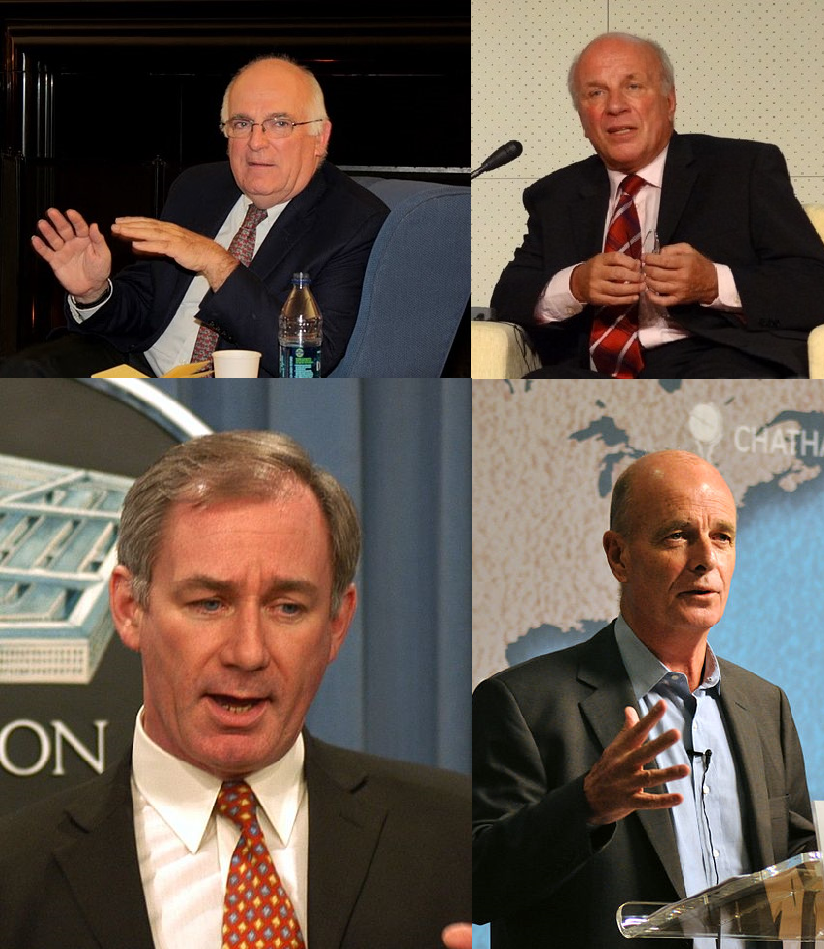
Four witnesses from the Hutton Inquiry: (Clockwise from top left) Richard Dearlove, Greg Dyke, John Scarlett and Geoff Hoon

From 11 August to 4 September 2003 witnesses to the inquiry were called in the order of the chronology of events. The second stage of the inquiry took place between 15 and 25 September 2003; Hutton explained that he "would ask persons, who had already given evidence and whose conduct might possibly be the subject of criticism in my report, to come back to be examined further". There was one additional day used, 13 October 2003, to hear from one witness who had been ill on their scheduled day. As well as members of the Kelly family, evidence was taken from BBC employees (including Gilligan, Watts and Richard Sambrook, the BBC's director of news) members of the government and its advisors (including Blair, Campbell, Hoon and McKinley) and civil servants, including John Scarlett, chairman of the JIC and Richard Dearlove, head of the Secret Intelligence Service (MI6).

One of the witnesses who gave evidence to Hutton was David Broucher, the UK's permanent representative to the Conference on Disarmament. In 2002 or 2003 he had asked Kelly what would happen if Iraq were invaded; Kelly had replied "I will probably be found dead in the woods". (Note: Broucher initially thought the conversation took place in September 2002, but then changed this to February 2003. Kelly's diaries record the meeting between the two in February 2002.) Over the 24 days evidence was taken, the inquiry questioned 74 witnesses and received over 10,000 pages of evidence; most of the documents, along with transcripts of the questioning, were published online by the inquiry team. Hutton reported on 28 January 2004 and wrote "I am satisfied that Dr Kelly took his own life by cutting his left wrist and that his death was hastened by his taking Co-proxamol tablets. I am further satisfied that there was no involvement by a third person in Dr Kelly's death".

Hutton also concluded that the September dossier had not been "sexed up" by the government, or by Campbell, but was the work of the JIC. He cleared the government and its ministers of any wrongdoing and reserved his criticism for the BBC and Gilligan. According to George Jones, the political correspondent for The Daily Telegraph, Hutton's judgement on the BBC was "damning and shocked its journalists with its ferocity. He said the corporation had a "defective" editorial system that allowed Gilligan to make "unfounded" claims questioning the Government's integrity".

Despite the conclusion of the Hutton report that Kelly killed himself, there was continued debate over the manner of his death. Several doctors questioned the conclusion on medical grounds, although their position has been doubted by pathologists. (Note: These include three doctors who wrote to The Guardian to state that they did "not consider the evidence given at the Hutton inquiry has demonstrated that Dr David Kelly committed suicide"; some of their conclusions have been challenged by members of the International Toxicology Advisory Group, who wrote to The BMJ to say it was a "mistaken notion" to think that post-mortem drug concentration in blood could be interpreted effectively.) The former leader of the Conservative Party, Michael Howard, and the former Liberal Democrat MP, Norman Baker, both thought Kelly was murdered. In 2007 Baker published The Strange Death of David Kelly in which he argued that Kelly did not die by suicide. Kelly's family expressed their displeasure at the publication; his sister-in-law said: "It is just raking over old bones. I can't speak for the whole family, but I've read it all [Baker's theories], every word, and I don't believe it."

== Subsequent events ==
In March 2004 the Oxfordshire coroner, Nicholas Gardiner, convened a hearing to decide whether there were the "exceptional circumstances" needed to resume the inquest; he concluded that such circumstances did not exist and that an inquest was not required.

In December 2009 six doctors applied to the Oxford coroner's office to reopen the inquest, claiming that there was insufficient evidence for Hutton's conclusion of suicide. Their request was turned down on legal advice, and they were informed that evidence relating to Kelly's death was to be kept secret for 70 years. Hutton stated that he did so "solely in order to protect Dr Kelly's widow and daughters for the remainder of their lives (the daughters being in their twenties at that time) from the distress which they would suffer from further discussion of the details of Dr Kelly's death in the media".

The Attorney General, Dominic Grieve, reviewed the case between 2010 and 2011. He spoke to both Hutton and Gardner before he concluded that there was no benefit in opening a new inquest into the matter; he stated that there was "overwhelmingly strong" evidence that Kelly killed himself. Prior to Grieve's decision, the government released the post-mortem and toxicology reports that Hutton had said should be sealed for 70 years. Both documents supported the conclusion of the Hutton Inquiry. The pathologist wrote in the post-mortem:

It is my opinion that the main factor involved in bringing about the death of David Kelly is the bleeding from the incised wounds to his left wrist. Had this not occurred he may well not have died at this time. Furthermore, on the balance of probabilities, it is likely that the ingestion of an excess number of co-proxamol tablets coupled with apparently clinically silent coronary artery disease would both have played a part in bringing about death more certainly and more rapidly than would have otherwise been the case. Therefore I give as the cause of death:

1a. Haemorrhage;
1b. Incised wounds to the left wrist;
2. Co-proxamol ingestion and coronary artery atherosclerosis.

Kelly's grave was a focal point for the campaign group "Justice for Kelly", who left placards demanding an inquest and undertook vigils at the graveside. Following complaints by his widow and a request by her to the Diocese of Oxford, Kelly's remains were exhumed in June 2017 and were reportedly cremated.

== Legacy ==
Kelly's death and the preceding events have served as an inspiration for artistic tributes and dramatisations, including the 2006 song "Harrowdown Hill" by Thom Yorke; a 2008 painting, Death of David Kelly, by Dexter Dalwood; Jonathan Coe's 2015 novel Number 11; and a poem, "Hand-Washing Technique – Government Guidelines" (subtitled "i.m. Dr David Kelly"), by Simon Armitage. Kelly was the subject of a 2005 television drama, The Government Inspector, starring Mark Rylance, and "Justifying War: Scenes from the Hutton Inquiry" a radio play by the Tricycle Theatre. Kelly's last moments are featured in the centre monologue of the stage play Palace of the End by Judith Thompson. There have also been documentaries on British television and radio about Kelly. (Note: These include: 30 September 2003: "David Kelly and the BBC" BBC World Service; 5 October 2003: "Death of a Scientist: The David Kelly Affair" on Channel 4; 21 January 2004: Panorama: "A Fight To The Death" BBC One; 13 February 2004: "Germ Warfare: Dr Kelly's Last Interview" on Channel 5; 25 February 2006: The Conspiracy Files: "David Kelly" on BBC Two; 29 July 2019: Witness History: "The Death of David Kelly" BBC World Service.)

In the 1996 Birthday Honours Kelly was appointed as Companion of the Order of St Michael and St George (CMG); the citation reads:

He devised the scientific basis for the enhanced biological warfare defence programme and led strong research groups in many key areas. Following the Gulf War he led the first biological warfare inspection in Iraq and has spent most of his time since either in Iraq or at various sites in the former Soviet Union helping to shed light on past biological warfare related activities and assisting the UK/US RUS trilateral confidence building process. He has pursued this work tirelessly and with good humour despite the significant hardship, hostility and personal risk encountered during extended periods of service in both countries. ... His efforts in his specialist field have had consequences of international significance.

Lord Hutton, in the report to his inquiry, suggested that Kelly might well have been under consideration for a knighthood in May 2003. Kelly's work in Iraq earned him a nomination for the Nobel Peace Prize; his biographer Norman Baker wrote of Kelly:

It is no exaggeration to say that between 1990 and his death in 2003, Dr Kelly probably did more to make the world a more secure place than anyone on the planet. Even among the elite group of international weapons inspectors, he was regarded with some awe, as the inspectors' inspector.

== Notes and references ==
=== Sources ===
==== Books ====
- Baker, Norman (2007). The Strange Death of David Kelly. London: Methuen. ISBN 978-1-84275-217-3.
- Cohen, Bob; Nadler, Eric (2009). Dead Silence: Fear and Terror on the Anthrax Trail. Berkeley, California: Counterpoint. ISBN 978-1-5824-3944-0.
- Davies, Philip (2012). Intelligence and Government in Britain and the United States: A Comparative Perspective. Santa Barbara, California: ABC-CLIO. ISBN 978-1-4408-0281-2.
- Dodd, Vikram (2004). "The Walk". In Rogers, Simon (ed.). The Hutton Inquiry and Its Impact. London: Politico's Guardian Books. pp. 67–83. ISBN 978-1-84275-106-0.
- Goslett, Miles (2018). An Inconvenient Death: How the Establishment Covered Up the David Kelly Affair. London: Head of Zeus. ISBN 978-1-78854-308-8.
- Leitenberg, Milton; Zilinskas, Raymond A.; Kuhn, Jens H. (2012). The Soviet Biological Weapons Program: a History (Kindle ed.). Cambridge, Massachusetts: Harvard University Press. ISBN 978-0-674-06526-0.
- Lewis, Robert (2013). Dark Actors: The Life and Death of David Kelly. London: Simon and Schuster. ISBN 978-0-85720-919-1.
- Marsh, Kevin (2012). Stumbling Over Truth: The Inside Story and the 'Sexed Up' Dossier, Hutton and the BBC. London: Biteback Publishing. ISBN 978-1-84954-475-7.
- Miller, Judith; Broad, William; Engelberg, Stephen (2012). Germs: Biological Weapons and America's Secret War. New York: Simon and Schuster. ISBN 978-1-4391-2815-2.
- Pearson, Graham S. (2000). The UNSCOM Saga: Chemical and Biological Weapons Non-Proliferation. London: Macmillan Press. ISBN 978-0-312-22959-7.
- Quilligan, Michael (2013). Understanding Shadows: The Corrupt Use of Intelligence. Atlanta, Georgia: Clarity Press, Inc. ISBN 978-0-9853353-9-7.
- Rogers, Simon (2004). "The Inquiry in Numbers". In Rogers, Simon (ed.). The Hutton Inquiry and Its Impact. London: Politico's Guardian Books. p. i. ISBN 978-1-84275-106-0.
- Rusbridger, Alan (2004). "Foreword". In Rogers, Simon (ed.). The Hutton Inquiry and Its Impact. London: Politico's Guardian Books. pp. vi–viii. ISBN 978-1-84275-106-0.
- Smithson, Amy (2011). Germ Gambits: The Bioweapons Dilemma, Iraq and Beyond. Stanford, California: Stanford University Press. ISBN 978-0-8047-8071-1.
- Wagner, Corinna; Brown, Andy (2016). A Body of Work: An Anthology of Poetry and Medicine. London: Bloomsbury Academic. ISBN 978-1-4725-1181-2.
- Watt, Nicholas (2004). "The Firestorm Breaks". In Rogers, Simon (ed.). The Hutton Inquiry and Its Impact. London: Politico's Guardian Books. pp. 42–66. ISBN 978-1-84275-106-0.
- Wells, Matt (2004). "The Story of the Story". In Rogers, Simon (ed.). The Hutton Inquiry and Its Impact. London: Politico's Guardian Books. pp. 28–41. ISBN 978-1-84275-106-0.

==== Reports, including transcripts and evidence ====
- Chilcot, John (6 July 2016). The Report of the Iraq Inquiry: Executive Summary (Report). London: The Stationery Office. ISBN 978-1-4741-3331-9. Archived from the original on 23 November 2017.
- Hunt, Nicholas (25 July 2003). "Final Post Mortem Report" (PDF). Ministry of Justice.
- Hutton, Lord (2004). Report of the Inquiry into the Circumstances Surrounding the Death of Dr David Kelly C.M.G. (PDF) (Report). London: The Stationery Office. ISBN 978-0-1029-2715-3. Archived from the original (PDF) on 15 May 2011.
  - "Attachment B – Susan Watts' notebook 45 – transcription of shorthand notes" (PDF). 8 September 2003. Archived from the original (PDF) on 8 September 2005.
  - "Dr Kelly's evidence to ISC 16/07/03" (PDF). 16 July 2003. Archived from the original (PDF) on 8 September 2005.
  - "Full transcript of tape recorded interview with Dr Kelly 30/05/03" (PDF). Archived from the original (PDF) on 8 September 2005.
  - "Hutton Inquiry – Hearing Transcript 4". 12 August 2003. Archived from the original on 8 September 2005.
  - "Hutton Inquiry – Hearing Transcript 5". 12 August 2003. Archived from the original on 8 September 2005.
  - "Hutton Inquiry – Hearing Transcript 8". 12 August 2003. Archived from the original on 8 September 2005.
  - "Hutton Inquiry – Hearing Transcript 17". 25 August 2003. Archived from the original on 8 September 2005.
  - "Hutton Inquiry – Hearing Transcript 24". 25 August 2003. Archived from the original on 8 September 2005.
  - "Hutton Inquiry – Hearing Transcript 26". 8 September 2003. Archived from the original on 8 September 2005.
  - "Hutton Inquiry – Hearing Transcript 29". 25 August 2003. Archived from the original on 8 September 2005.
  - "Hutton Inquiry – Hearing Transcript 33". 8 September 2003. Archived from the original on 8 September 2005.
  - "Hutton Inquiry – Hearing Transcript 35". 25 August 2003. Archived from the original on 8 September 2005.
  - "Letter Dr Kelly to Dr Wells 30 /06/03" (PDF). 25 August 2003. Archived from the original (PDF) on 8 September 2005.
  - "MOD Statement" (PDF). 12 August 2003. Archived from the original (PDF) on 8 September 2005.
  - "Notes made on organiser of the meeting 22/05/03" (PDF). Archived from the original (PDF) on 8 September 2005.
  - "Radio 4 Today Programme 29/05/03" (PDF). Archived from the original (PDF) on 8 September 2005.
- "Iraq: Failing to Disarm" (PDF). US Department of State.
- Iraq – Its Infrastructure of Concealment, Deception and Intimidation (PDF) (Report). January 2003. OCLC 912764049. Archived from the original (PDF) on 19 June 2004.
- Joint Intelligence Committee (24 September 2002). Iraq's Weapons of Mass Destruction: the Assessment of the British Government (Report). London: The Stationery Office. Archived from the original on 30 January 2010.
- Kelly, David (2002). "The Trilateral Agreement: lessons for biological weapons verification". In Findlay, Trevor; Meier, Oliver (eds.). Verification Yearbook 2002 (PDF). London: Verification Research, Training and Information Centre (VERTIC). pp. 93–109. ISBN 978-1-899548-35-4.
- Ministry of Defence (December 2003). Operations in Iraq, Lessons for the Future (Report). London: Directorate General Corporate Communication. OCLC 55217113.
- "Oral evidence. Taken before the Foreign Affairs Committee on Tuesday 15 July 2003". Parliament. 15 July 2003.

==== Journals and magazines ====
- al-Marashi, Ibrahim (June 2006). "The "Dodgy Dossier:" The Academic Implications of the British Government's Plagiarism Incident". Middle East Studies Association Bulletin. 40 (1): 33–43. doi:10.1017/S0026318400049385. JSTOR 23062632. S2CID 157849660.
- Buczacki, Stefan (Autumn 2003). "Dr David Kelly (1965)". Linacre News. No. 26. pp. 14–15.
- Drummer, Olaf; Forrest, A. Robert W.; Goldberger, Bruce; Karch, Steven B. (18 September 2004). "Forensic Science In The Dock: Postmortem Measurements Of Drug Concentration In Blood Have Little Meaning". The BMJ. 329 (7467): 636–637. doi:10.1136/bmj.329.7467.636. JSTOR 25469111. PMC 517629. PMID 15374894.
- Ekéus, Rolf (8 September 2016). "The Lessons of UNSCOM and Iraq". The Nonproliferation Review. 23 (1–2): 131–146. doi:10.1080/10736700.2016.1186875. S2CID 151688949.
- Findlay, Trevor (September 2005). "Looking Back: The UN Monitoring, Verification and Inspection Commission". Arms Control Today. 35 (7): 45–48. JSTOR 23627820.
- "IAEA and UNSCOM Inspection Teams In Iraq Since the Gulf War". Arms Control Today. 23 (3): 29. April 1993. JSTOR 23624961.
- Kelly, D. C. (February 1976). ""Oryctes" virus replication: Electron microscopic observations on infected moth and mosquito cells". Virology. 69 (2): 596–606. doi:10.1016/0042-6822(76)90488-8. PMID 18621357.
- Mangold, Tom (October 2008). "Kelly, David Christopher (1944–2003)". Oxford Dictionary of National Biography (online ed.). Oxford University Press. doi:10.1093/ref:odnb/92249. (Subscription, Wikipedia Library access or UK public library membership required.)
- "No. 54427". The London Gazette. 14 June 1996. p. 3.
- Stone, Richard (25 July 2003). "British Expert Leaves Impressive Arms Control Legacy". Science. 301 (5632): 445–447. doi:10.1126/science.301.5632.445. JSTOR 3834650. PMID 12881537. S2CID 153805162.

==== News ====
- Aaronovitch, David (23 October 2007). "A weapons expert, a rose grower and a fantasist". The Times. p. 17.
- Beaumont, Peter; Barnett, Antony; Hinsliff, Gaby (15 June 2003). "Iraqi mobile labs nothing to do with germ warfare, report finds". The Observer.
- Billington, Michael (2 November 2010). "Palace of the End – review". The Guardian.
- Brady, Brian; Shields, Rachel (21 October 2007). "Kelly family appeals for calm after new murder claims by MP". The Independent. Archived from the original on 24 December 2007.
- Burden, Elizabeth (30 October 2017). "Family secretly exhumed the remains of David Kelly". The Times.
- "Chilcot inquiry: Kelly secrecy ruling". The Guardian. 25 January 2010. p. 7.
- Clark, Alex (11 November 2015). "Number 11 by Jonathan Coe review – a sequel to What a Carve Up!". The Guardian.
- "David Kelly. Biological warfare adviser who recently came under the spotlight during the Government's row with the BBC". The Daily Telegraph. 19 July 2003. p. 33.
- "Day four: Key points". BBC. 2 October 2003.
- "Doctors demand formal inquest for Dr David Kelly". BBC. 5 December 2009.
- Dodd, Vikram (17 July 2013). "Kelly's death remains unresolved for some". The Guardian. p. 11.
- "Dr David Kelly: Controversial death examined". BBC. 17 December 2011.
- Gilligan, Andrew (1 June 2003). "I asked my intelligence source why Blair misled us all over Saddam's weapons. His reply? One word ... CAMPBELL". The Mail on Sunday. p. 26.
- Grice, Andrew; Sengupta, Kim (21 July 2003). "BBC chairman under fire after admitting Kelly was key source". The Independent. p. 1.
- Halpin, David; Frost, Stephen; Sennett, Searle (27 January 2004). "Letters: Our doubts about Dr Kelly's suicide". The Guardian.
- Higgins, Charlotte (4 May 2010). "Turner prize shortlist includes painter who imagines death of Dr David Kelly". The Guardian.
- Hirsch, Afua (26 January 2010). "Hutton inquiry closed Kelly medical reports for 70 years". The Guardian. p. 12.
- "The Hutton report: main points". The Times. 28 January 2004. (subscription required)
- Jones, George (29 January 2004). "BBC in crisis, Blair in clear". The Daily Telegraph. p. 3.
- "Kelly coroner names hearing date". BBC. 4 March 2004.
- Kelly, David (31 August 2003). "David Kelly: The threat from Saddam". The Observer.
- "Kelly's death may be re-examined". The Daily Telegraph. 14 August 2010. p. 2.
- Lawson, Mark (14 March 2005). "Lawson on TV: The Government Inspector". The Guardian.
- McLean, Craig (18 June 2006). "Thom Yorke: 'It's not my job to do business with politicians'". The Observer.
- "Minister rules out Kelly inquest". BBC. 9 June 2011.
- Morris, Steven (7 August 2003). "Kelly funeral brings calm in the storm: Service remembers happy family man with pride in Welsh roots while media kept at arm's length". The Guardian. p. 2.
- Morrison, Blake (31 March 2007). "The fatal flaw". The Guardian.
- "New suspicion over Kelly death – MP". The Guardian. 15 October 2007. Archived from the original on 18 January 2008.
- "Obituary: David Kelly". The Times. 21 July 2003. p. 25. (subscription required)
- Payne, Stewart (22 July 2003). "Baha'i funeral for convert to Middle-Eastern religion". The Daily Telegraph. p. 7.
- "Picture Gallery". The Times. 19 July 2003. p. 1.
- Rawlinson, Kevin (29 October 2017). "Body of WMD dossier scientist David Kelly exhumed". The Guardian. p. 5.
- Rayner, Gordon; Hope, Christopher (23 October 2010). "No evidence of foul play, says Kelly pathologist; Weapons inspector died from self-inflicted cuts, says report released to counter conspiracy theories". The Daily Telegraph. p. 5.
- Sanger, David E. (22 October 2002). "Threats and Responses: The President; Bush Declares U.S. is Using Diplomacy to Disarm Hussein". The New York Times.
- Scurr, Ruth (14 November 2015). "Jonathan Coe's raucous social satire smoulders with anger". The Spectator. Archived from the original on 12 January 2020.
- Sengupta, Kim (19 July 2003). "A man who looked what he was: a scientist with a calm, patient manner". The Independent. p. 5.
- Sengupta, Kim; Grice, Andrew (19 July 2003). "The death of a civil servant: adviser 'felt betrayed' over treatment in Gilligan affair". The Independent. p. 2.
- Sengupta, Kim; Peachey, Paul (21 July 2003). "The death of a civil servant: confirming source places BBC directly in the line of fire". The Independent. p. 5.
- "Sunday, October 5". The Times. 4 October 2003.
- Taylor, Matthew (22 October 2010a). "David Kelly postmortem reveals injuries were self-inflicted". The Guardian.
- Taylor, Matthew (23 October 2010b). "Medical documents: Secret papers point to scientist's suicide". The Guardian. p. 5.
- Taylor, Paul (5 November 2010). "Palace of the End, Arcola Theatre, London". The Independent.
- Taylor, Terence (31 July 2003). "Obituary: David Kelly. Model weapons inspector in Russia and then in Iraq". The Independent. p. 18.
- "Television: Friday, February 13". The Times. 7 February 2004.
- "Timeline: David Kelly". BBC. 22 February 2007.
- Tweedie, Neil (7 August 2003). "Quiet burial for Kelly amid political storm Lord Hutton, who will hold an inquiry into the scientist's death, is among mourners as widow asks that turmoil be put aside". The Daily Telegraph. p. 6.
- Vallely, Paul (21 August 2010). "The Kelly Affair: Anatomy of a Conspiracy Theory". The Independent. p. 18.
- Watt, Nicholas (10 June 2011). "Attorney general rejects call for fresh inquest into weapons expert's death: No evidence of a cover-up, over Dr Kelly, says Grieve". The Guardian. p. 15.
- White, Michael; Norton-Taylor, Richard; Morris, Steven; Wells, Matt (19 July 2003). "Crisis for the Blair government. Dossiers and denials. Spin and subterfuge. Now ... The vendetta's victim". The Guardian. p. 1.

==== Websites ====
- "BBC – Radio 4 Front Row – 30/10/03". BBC. Archived from the original on 24 January 2020.
- "Biological Weapons – UNODA". United Nations. Archived from the original on 13 January 2020.
- Bush, George W. (29 January 2002). "President Delivers State of the Union Address". The White House.
- "David Kelly and the BBC". BBC. 30 September 2003.
- "Dexter Dalwood and the Tate Collection". Tate. Archived from the original on 10 February 2010.
- "Dr David Kelly: the Conspiracy Files". The Radio Times. 22 February 2007. p. 74. Archived from the original on 24 January 2020.
- "The Government Inspector". Channel 4. 18 July 2016.
- Horrocks, Peter (20 January 2004). "BBC – Press Office – Panorama A Fight to the Death". BBC.
- Powell, Colin (5 February 2003). "Remarks to the United Nations Security Council". Department of State.
- "Security Council Resolution 687 – UNSCR". United Nations.
- "Security Council Resolution 1441 (2002)". United Nations.
- "UNMOVIC: Basic facts". United Nations.
- "Witness History, The death of David Kelly". BBC.

==== Television ====
- Germ Warfare: Dr Kelly's Last Interview (Television production). Five. 13 February 2004.

=== Further viewing ===
- Films and video
  - Dead In The Woods (2007) Investigative documentary that explores the links between Kelly's death and a global bio-weapons conspiracy. Scheduled for international theatrical release and broadcast in 2008.
  - David Kelly: The Conspiracy Files (2007) ("David Kelly: The Conspiracy Files". BBC News. 7 December 2006.) BBC Documentary exploring the death of Dr. Kelly and the conspiracy surrounding it.
  - 60 Minutes – report on former USSR's smallpox programme, and David Kelly's role in investigating both Soviet and Iraqi smallpox labs
