= Miles Goslett =

British journalist

Miles Goslett is a journalist. He has worked for the Evening Standard, the Sunday Telegraph and the Mail on Sunday. He was the U.K. editor for Heat Street.

== Career ==
Goslett has won the 'Scoop of the Year' award four times: once at the 2009 British Press Awards, and three times at the London Press Club awards in 2009, 2013 and 2016.

The 2009 awards were for exposing the 'Sachsgate' scandal. The 2013 award was for his exposure of the Jimmy Savile sexual abuse scandal, and is shared with journalists Meirion Jones, Liz MacKean and Mark Williams-Thomas. The 2016 award was for exposing the Kids Company scandal.

In a Press Gazette interview, Goslett said he offered the Savile story to seven national newspapers in 2011 but every one declined to publish it. Richard Ingrams of The Oldie was the only editor who was willing to run the story, making the magazine the first publication to reveal Savile's abuse of underage girls on BBC premises. In 2013, Goslett challenged ex-BBC chief Mark Thompson in a New York street about his knowledge of the Savile affair for Channel 4 News. In 2014, he revealed that Nick Pollard, the chairman of a BBC Inquiry into the Savile scandal, rang him and admitted he made a "mistake" in his report by failing to note Thompson's involvement in the controversy.

In February 2016 Goslett was named UK editor of the Dow Jones news and opinion website Heat Street.

In April 2018 Goslett published a book on the death of Dr David Kelly titled An Inconvenient Death: How the Establishment Covered Up the David Kelly Affair (ISBN 9781788543095). It was a Daily Telegraph Book of the Year, the Book of the Day in the Guardian.

In April 2024, Goslett was cited in The Guardian as being chief researcher to Lord Michael Ashcroft of Belize, in an article discussing the smears made against Angela Rayner.

On 3 July 2026, Goslett was named the new communications chief for Reform UK.
