= Naukograd =

Russian cities with many R&D facilities

Naukograd (Russian: наукогра́д, IPA: [nəʊkɐˈgrat], also technopole), meaning "science city", is a formal term for towns with high concentrations of research and development facilities in Russia and the Soviet Union, some specifically built by the Soviet Union for these purposes. Some of the towns were secret and were part of a larger system of closed cities in the USSR, many built by forced labour from the Soviet Gulag.

In modern-day Russian Federation, the term naukograd refers to 12 inhabited localities and 1 municipality which have been granted a special status and privileges for their "high scientific and technical potential" and "for having a formational scientific—industrial complex" (according to a 1995 State Duma bill). Of the 13 naukograds, eight are located in Moscow Oblast and the rest are scattered across 5 regions (Altai Krai, Kaluga Oblast, Novosibirsk Oblast, Tambov Oblast, and the federal city of Moscow). Some still have military connections, such as Fryazino, where advanced radio and electronics devices are developed, but most are now focusing on civilian work with the help of Western aid funds. Some naukograds are operated by the Russian Academy of Sciences, including Chernogolovka, a center for physics and chemistry, and, formerly, Pushchino, a center for microbiology and biochemistry.

The first town to be officially designated "naukograd" in 2000 was Obninsk, a town with many nuclear and other special materials, meteorological and medical research facilities. Two others followed in 2001: Dubna, an international nuclear research centre and Korolyov, where many space research facilities are located. In 2003 Koltsovo, near Akademgorodok, originally the home of the biowarfare centre Vector but now a centre for pharmaceutical and medical research, Reutov, Fryazino, Michurinsk were also granted the status of naukograd, with even more towns being receiving the status in the following years.

== List of naukograds of Russia ==
As of 2026, 11 towns, 1 work settlement and 1 urban okrug have been officially designated the status of naukograd:

Name	Region	Date the status was granted/renewed	Source
Biysk	Altai Krai	21.11.2005	
Biysk	Altai Krai	29.03.2011	
Biysk	Altai Krai	30.12.2015	
Biysk	Altai Krai	01.01.2017	
Chernogolovka	Moscow Oblast	18.08.2008	
Chernogolovka	Moscow Oblast	30.06.2014	
Chernogolovka	Moscow Oblast	30.06.2019	
Dolgoprudny	Moscow Oblast	06.02.2026	
Dubna	Moscow Oblast	20.12.2001	
Fryazino	Moscow Oblast	29.12.2003	
Koltsovo	Novosibirsk Oblast	17.01.2003	
Korolyov	Moscow Oblast	12.04.2001	
Michurinsk	Tambov Oblast	04.11.2003	
Obninsk	Kaluga Oblast	06.05.2000	
Reutov	Moscow Oblast	29.12.2003	
Serpukhov Urban Okrug	Moscow Oblast	24.07.2024	
Troitsk	Moscow, Troitsky administrative Okrug	29.01.2007	
Troitsk	Moscow, Troitsky administrative Okrug	07.09.2012	
Troitsk	Moscow, Troitsky administrative Okrug	07.09.2017	
Zhukovsky	Moscow Oblast	29.01.2007	
Zhukovsky	Moscow Oblast	19.11.2012	
Zhukovsky	Moscow Oblast	19.11.2017	

== See also ==
- Closed city
- List of closed cities
- College town
