= Trevor Findlay =

Canadian scientist

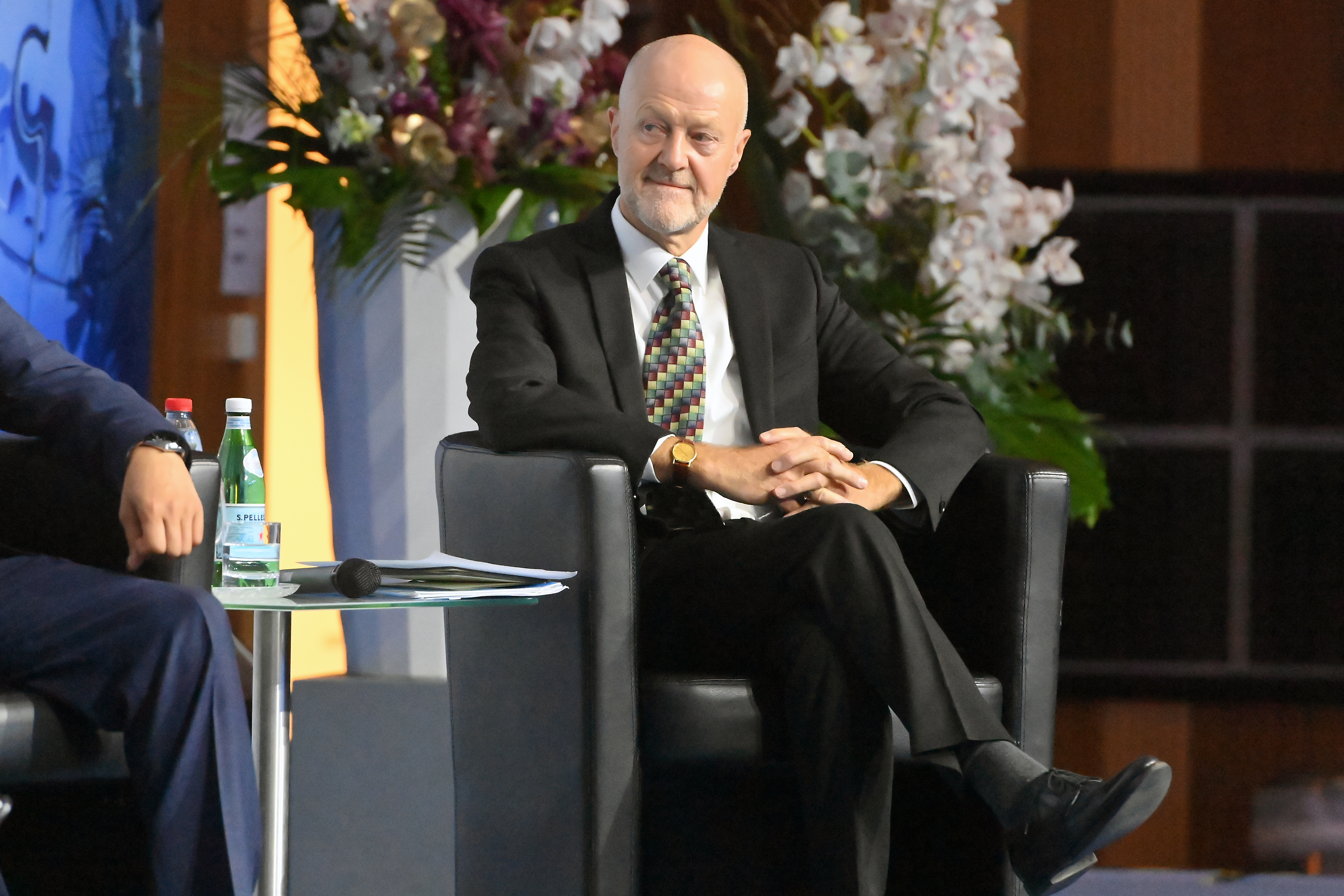
in 2022

Trevor Findlay is director of the Nuclear Energy Futures Project at the Centre for International Governance Innovation (CIGI) in Waterloo, Ontario. He heads the CIGI project on the future of the IAEA. Findlay wrote the report on the Future of Nuclear Energy to 2030 which said that "transparency and collaboration should be engendered by establishing a global nuclear safety network encompassing all stakeholders -relevant international organizations, governments, civil society and, most vitally, the nuclear industry".

Findlay is also a professor at the Norman Paterson School of International Affairs and director of the Canadian Centre for Treaty Compliance at Carleton University.

== See also ==
- Louise Fréchette
- Benjamin K. Sovacool
- Amory Lovins
- Mycle Schneider
- Stephen Thomas (economist)
- Renewable energy policy
- Nuclear energy policy
