= Lev Sandakchiev =

Russian Virologist

Lev Stepanovich Sandakchiev (Russian: Лев Степанович Сандахчиев; 11 January 1937 in Rostov-on-Don – 29 June 2006 in Koltsovo) was a Soviet and Russian scientist, specialist in molecular biology and virology, Doctor of biology, Professor, and Academician of Russian Academy of Sciences. He was the founder and the first head of State Research Center of Virology and Biotechnology VECTOR, director of it from 1982 to 2005.

== Sources ==
- 1. Obituary. In memory of Lev Stepanovich Sandakchiev, Journal "Science in Siberia" http://www.sbras.ru/HBC/article.phtml?nid=381&id=23
- 2. In memory of Lev Stepanovich Sandakchiev, Russian Academy of Science http://www.ras.ru/win/db/show_per.asp?P=.id-1495.ln-ru
