= Koltsovo, Novosibirsk Oblast =

Koltsovo Кольцово
- Work settlement
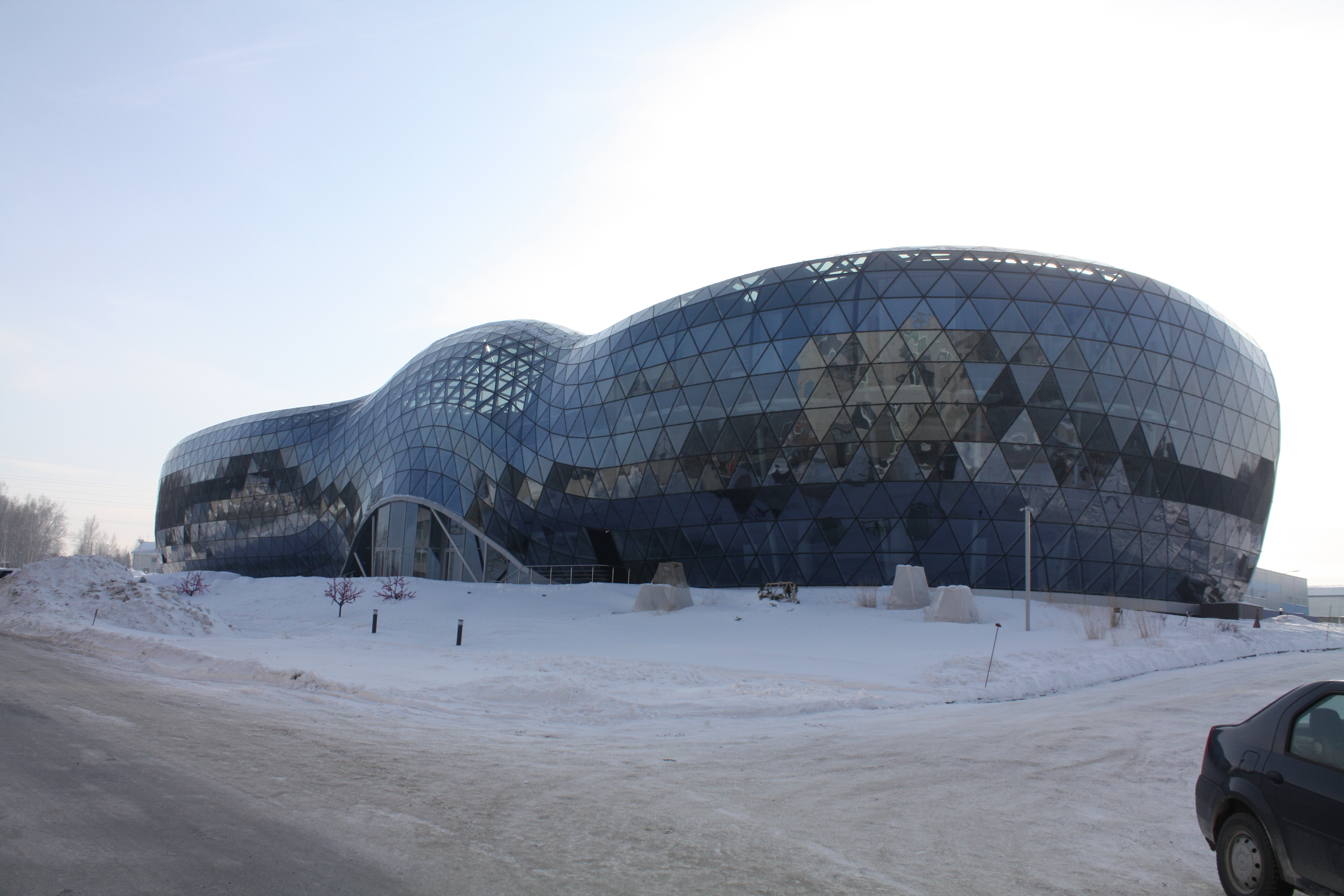

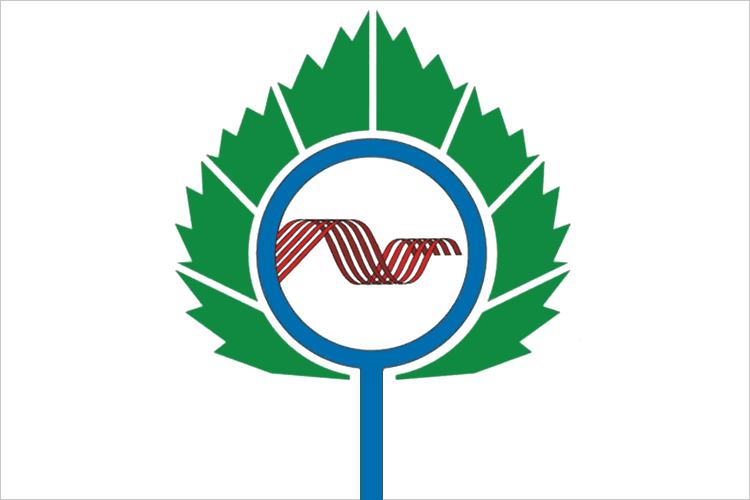
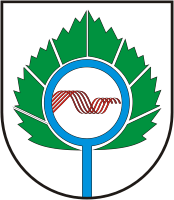
- Flag Coat of arms
- Interactive map of Koltsovo
- Location of Koltsovo Koltsovo (Novosibirsk Oblast)
- Coordinates: 54°56′20″N 83°11′00″E
- Country: Russia
- Federal subject: Novosibirsk Oblast
- Administrative district: Novosibirsky District
- Founded: August 30, 1979

Area
  - Total: 6.5 km^{2} (2.5 sq mi)
- Elevation: 200 m (660 ft)

Population (2010 Census)
  - Total: 12,319
  - Estimate (2025): 20,942 (+70%)
  - Density: 1,900/km^{2} (4,900/sq mi)

Municipal status
  - Urban okrug: Koltsovo Urban Okrug
  - Capital of: Koltsovo Urban Okrug
- Time zone: UTC+7 (MSK+4)
- Postal code: 630559
- Dialing code: +7 383
- OKTMO ID: 50740000051
- Website: kolcovo.ru

Koltsovo (Russian: Кольцо́во) is an urban locality (a work settlement) in Novosibirsky District of Novosibirsk Oblast, Russia. It is located about 10 kilometers (6.2 mi) northeast of Akademgorodok and 20 kilometers (12 mi) southeast of Novosibirsk's center. In 2013, the population of Koltsovo was 15,795.

Koltsovo is a naukograd, or "science town," of the Russian Federation.

== History ==
The history of Koltsovo began in 1974 and is inseparably linked with the creation of the State Research Center of Virology and Biotechnology VECTOR, an institute specialized in the study of especially dangerous viruses. The settlement, initially established as the home for the institute was named after famous Soviet biologist, cytologist and geneticist Nikolai Koltsov.

In 1989 or 1990, the village of Novoborsk became the new microdistrict of Koltsovo. Previously, this settlement was part of Baryshevsky Selsoviet.

On January 17, 2003, Koltsovo was granted naukograd (science town) status, which it is to retain until the end of 2025. The status is granted to the cities with high concentrations of scientific research and production capabilities. Koltsovo received its status by Russian President order no.45 of January 17, 2003.

Historically, the population of Koltsovo was 12,319 (2010 census); 9,570 (2002 census); 7,946 (1989 Soviet census). The locality's area is 18.8 km^{2}.

== Administrative and municipal status ==
Within the framework of administrative divisions, Koltsovo is subordinated to Novosibirsky District. As a municipal division, Koltsovo is incorporated separately as Koltsovo Urban Okrug.

== Science and business ==
Since its creation Koltsovo has been developing as a center of biotechnology, molecular biology and virology. For instance, Koltsovo’s Institute Vector is one of two places in the world which is an official repository of smallpox. The other smallpox store resides at the Center for Disease Control and Prevention in Atlanta, Georgia, USA.

The science-driven business of the Science town has always been nurtured by research conducted by Vector specialists. The first wave of commercialization of Vector developments took place in the 1990s and was sustained by the Vector director Lev Sandakchiev. A number of research spin-offs were created at that period, including Vector-Medica, Vector-Best, Vector-Bialgam, ImDi, which are currently among the most prominent innovation enterprises in Koltsovo.

The research conducted in Koltsovo includes vaccines against breast cancer, hepatitis A and A+B, therapeutic HIV Vaccine and vaccine against pandemic H1N1 influenza; test-systems for early diagnostics of cancer, infectious diseases, TORCH-infections, zoonosis infections, hepatitis C, as well as deadly viruses such as Ebola, Marburg, Machupo, Lassa, dengue and yellow fever.

Koltsovo also has a number of companies active in functional food production, such as liquid probiotics with 100% content of bifidumbacteria, muesli enriched with probiotics, products based on pure extracts of pine and fir, different types of food supplements.

Not only virology and biotechnology in different aspects attract attention of researchers from Koltsovo. Koltsovo is a home to a large IT company Center of Financial Technologies, software developer for financial, healthcare and public sectors, known for its creation of the Russian payment system Zolotaya Korona.

Koltsovo has an infrastructure for science-driven business, including:

1. Innovation center Koltsovo, a non-for-profit organization established in 2000 in order to assist the start and development of local innovation business
2. Business-incubator Koltsovo, established in 2006, which rents offices to innovation start-ups on beneficial conditions
3. BioTechnopark Koltsovo, opened in 2011, is an area of 114 hectares aimed for location of production and R&D premises of biotech companies. The BioTechnopark Koltsovo shall launch a Joint usage center in September 2014 which will serve as a certification and production center for BioTech start-ups, as well as a location for classes of the new Master’s program on biotechnology, launched jointly by Vector and Novosibirsk State University.

In 2013 the Ministry of Economic Development of the Russian Federation has adopted the creation of a joint BioPharma and IT cluster in Novosibirsk region with the BioPharma centered in Koltsovo. In 2014 35 companies of Koltsovo, as well as biotech companies from Akademgorodok and Berdsk have created a non-profit partnership BioPharm as an instrument for fostering cooperation and interests protection.

On September 16, 2019, an explosion occurred in a decontamination room on the fifth floor of a six-story building at the laboratory complex. At the time, the area was being renovated, and purportedly there were no biohazard substances in the room. Windows were blown out and one contractor was sent to intensive care at a hospital with severe burns. The lab management assured the World Health Organization that the smallpox repository had not been impacted by the event. However, in a worst-case scenario, this does not rule out the possibility that some form of pathogens might have been dispersed by the blast.

== Society and economy ==
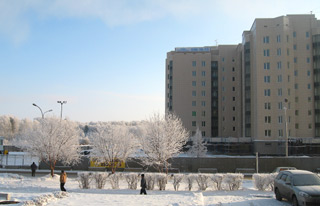
View of Koltsovo

Koltsovo is the least populated naukograd in Russia, but it takes the lead among other naukograds in tax revenue, volume of produced innovation products, residential construction, and birth rate. Koltsovo is surrounded by coniferous and birch trees. The apartment buildings are alternated by green plantations. The location of the Science town, its vicinity to Novosibirsk and the adjacent science center Akademgorodok, create a special ambiance and energy from business and social life.

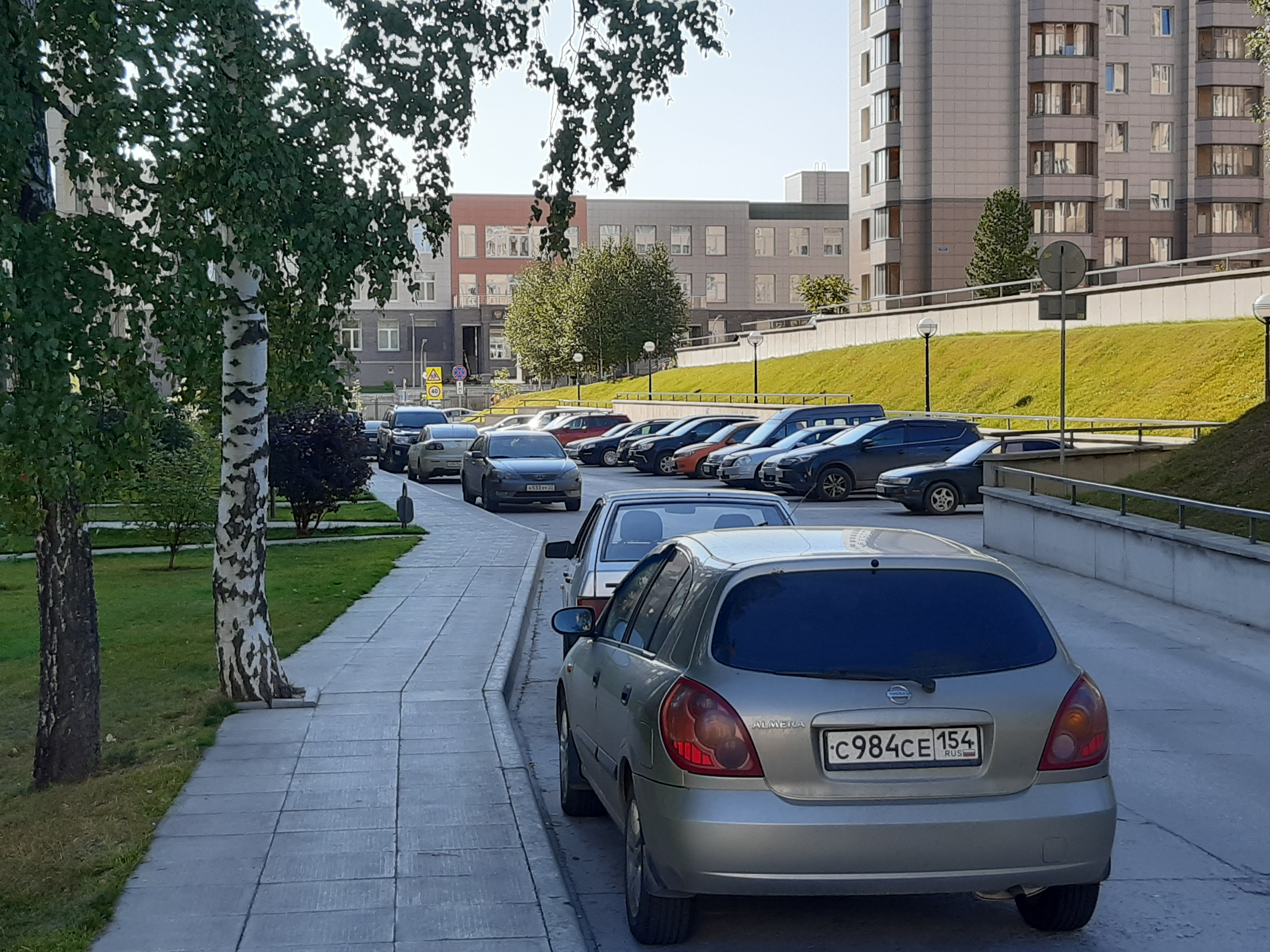
3rd Microdistrict

Since 2006 in Koltsovo 4 new neighborhoods have been constructed and the 5th is planned to be built in the next 5 years. It provides population growth as well as high birth rate in Koltsovo. Koltsovo has a high-level medical complex, including a refurbished policlinic with new center for rehabilitation for children with cerebral palsy, schools, including a boarding school with specialisation in biotechnology, kindergartens, recreation centers, a recently refurbished art school, trading centers, drug stores, market, cafés, and a hotel. Koltsovo Park offers downhill skiing in winter and fishing and horse riding in summer. Koltsovo has a stadium, refurbished in 2008, with running tracks, tennis court, football and volleyball fields. The social life thrives with guest performances of Novosibirsk theaters and concerts. The Youth Parliament, which implements social projects, was organized by students living in Koltsovo.

== International cooperation ==
Koltsovo actively encourages international cooperation. The town is often visited by business and scientific delegations from European and Asian countries, such as Finland, Germany, the Netherlands, Norway, China, Thailand and others. Koltsovo businesses often send employees on company missions abroad, to countries like Finland, Greece, Germany and others. International cooperation is regulated by the Municipality of Koltsovo and guided by Innovation Center Koltsovo.
