= Protecting the Nation from Foreign Terrorist Entry into the United States =

Protecting the Nation from Foreign Terrorist Entry into the United States is the title of two Executive orders issued by U.S. President Donald Trump:

- Executive Order 13769
- Executive Order 13780

== See also ==
- Trump travel ban
