= Cargo 200 (code name) =

Russian code name for transported war casualties

Cargo 200 (Russian: Груз 200, romanized: Gruz 200) is a military code word used in the Soviet Union and the post-Soviet states referring to the transportation of military fatalities.

It is known since Soviet–Afghan War (1979 – 1989). Officially, the term Cargo 200 is military jargon to refer specifically to the corpses of soldiers contained in zinc-lined coffins for air transportation. Unofficially, Cargo 200 is used to refer to all bodies of the dead being transported away from the battlefield, and has also become a euphemism for irretrievable losses of military personnel in a conflict.

Colloquially the abbreviated term may be used in reporting, e.g., "We have one 200th and four 300ths", i.e., one killed and four wounded.

== Modern usage ==
The term Cargo 200 has received new international attention since the start of the Russo-Ukrainian War in 2014. Cargo 200 was referenced by the Ukrainian Ministry of Internal Affairs in the name of their 200rf.com website used to publicize Russian personnel killed and captured during the 2022 Russian invasion of Ukraine. Commander-in-Chief of the Armed Forces of Ukraine Oleksandr Syrskyi was nicknamed "General 200" in reference to the term Cargo 200 due to pursuing bloody Soviet-style military tactics which resulted in heavy Ukrainian casualties during the battle of Bakhmut.

The name is alluded in the name "Russia 200" of the project by Mediazona and BBC Russian Service, a named database of confirmed Russian military casualties during the 2022 Russian invasion of Ukraine, maintained since May 2022.

== Related military code words ==
- Cargo 100: Ammunition
- Cargo 300: Wounded
- Cargo 400: Concussed or otherwise mentally impaired
- Cargo 500: Originally used for medicine, but has recently seen use to refer to "refuseniks" (conscientious objectors)
- Cargo 600: Prisoners of War
- Cargo 700: Money, jewelry, and other financial reserves.
- Cargo 800: Chemical weaponry, toxic substances, and WMDs

== See also ==
- Cargo 200, 2007 Russian thriller film by Aleksei Balabanov
- Black Tulip, aircraft infamous for delivering Cargo-200
- Russia 200, Project listing Russian military deaths in Ukraine
