= Russia 200 =

Project listing Russian military deaths in Ukraine

- Website type: Casualties database
- Available in: Russian, English
- Owners: Mediazona and BBC Russian Service
- Website: 200.zona.media
- Launched: 2022 (data collection); 24 February 2025 (website)
- Current status: active

Russia 200 («Россия 200»; website: 200.zona.media) is a collaborative journalism project run by Mediazona, BBC Russian Service, and a team of volunteers, which since 2022 has maintained a named list of confirmed Russian military deaths during the 2022 Russian invasion of Ukraine. The name alludes to "Cargo 200" (груз 200), Soviet military terminology for transporting a fallen soldier's remains to their burial site.

By February 2026, the fourth anniversary of the invasion, the project's website had recorded more than 200,000 confirmed entries.

== Description ==
The project is a named database compiled from open sources: obituaries on social media, regional news reports, statements from local authorities, and photographs and interviews from burial sites.

The named list is one of several approaches to counting Russian casualties. Separately, Meduza and Mediazona developed a statistical estimation method based on Russia's inheritance registry: since a probate filing confirms the applicant's death, this source captures deaths not reflected in open sources and yields substantially higher overall estimates.

The project's authors estimated that the named list captures between 45 and 65 percent of the actual death toll.

== Background ==
The project is run jointly by Mediazona, BBC Russian Service, and a team of volunteers. The composition of the volunteer team is not disclosed in the project's public materials.

Mediazona is a Russian news outlet founded in 2014 by Pyotr Verzilov and Sergei Smirnov. Russian authorities have placed the outlet under sustained pressure: its website was blocked in Russia in March 2022, and Mediazona along with both founders has been designated a foreign agent under Russian law.

BBC Russian Service is a British Russian-language broadcaster headquartered in Riga, Latvia. Since 2022, Roskomnadzor has blocked access to the outlet's website for users in Russia.

== Methodology ==
A death is considered confirmed if at least one of the following conditions is met: publication in a Russian official source or state media; entry in a government registry; a report from relatives containing identifying details; or photographic evidence from the burial site.

Casualties from the self-proclaimed Donetsk People's Republic (DPR) and Luhansk People's Republic (LPR) are excluded from the main list, with two exceptions: Russian citizens who volunteered to join those formations, and—from January 2023, following the integration of DPR and LPR "people's militia" units into the Russian Armed Forces—residents of Donetsk Oblast and Luhansk Oblast, counted as foreign nationals within Russian units.

Data from Ukrainian sources, personnel list leaks, and other non-public materials may be used to identify names, but do not independently constitute confirmation; any names identified this way are cross-checked against Russian open sources.

The dataset has been used in academic research. Alexey Bessudnov of the University of Exeter applied it to study ethnic and regional inequality in casualty distribution.

=== Origins (2022) ===
Mediazona began systematic named tracking of casualties in collaboration with BBC Russian Service and a volunteer team in May 2022. Regular summaries are published every two weeks.

According to the journalists in an interview with the organizers of the Redkollegia Prize, for the first three years the project's authors published only aggregate figures rather than the list of names, citing security concerns for the volunteers collecting the data.

=== Website 200.zona.media ===
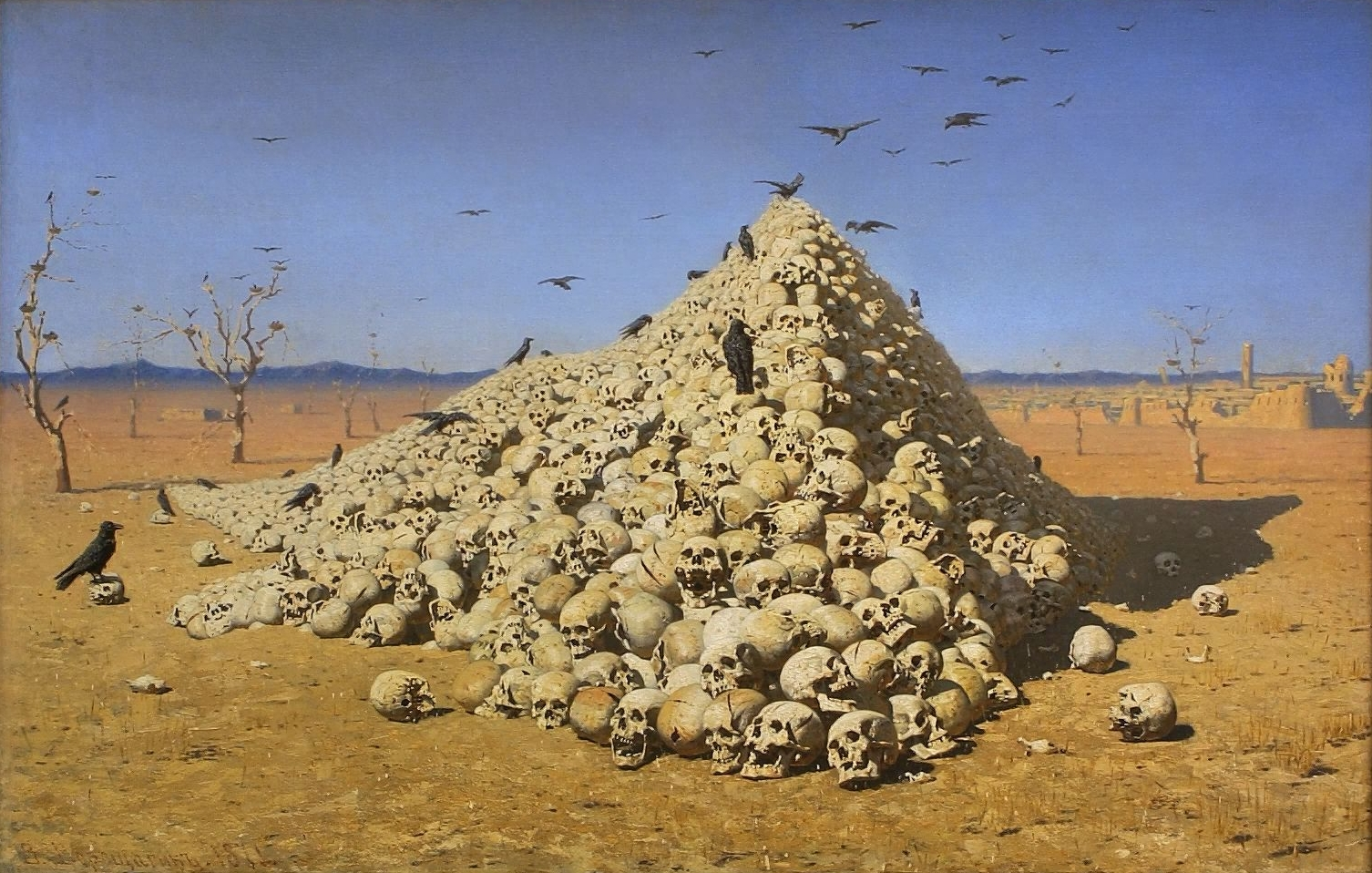
The Apotheosis of War (1871) by Vasily Vereshchagin, the painting whose composition is replicated from photographs of the fallen on the 200.zona.media website.

On 24 February 2025, the third anniversary of the invasion, the full named list was made publicly available on a dedicated website at the subdomain 200.zona.media. The site allows users to search by name and filter entries by region, branch of service, and military rank. At launch, the data was presented as an infographic in which photographs of the dead composed a mosaic image of Vasily Vereshchagin's painting The Apotheosis of War (1871). Mediazona journalist Dmitry Treshchanin explained that the team had from the outset been looking for a way to convey the scale of the losses visually—a plain table of names was not seen as adequate. The starting point was Afghan war rugs, in which imagery of modern warfare is woven into traditional ornament. That associative chain led to Vereshchagin: The Apotheosis of War was painted in the same part of the world, and the artist, who spent his life documenting war, was never able to leave it behind.

The list contained approximately 95,000 names at launch. Kremlin spokesman Dmitry Peskov, responding to questions from journalists, said he was unaware of the publication and described casualty figures as the "exclusive prerogative" of the Ministry of Defence.

On 24 February 2026, the fourth anniversary, the total exceeded 200,000 entries: 200,186 names were published. In the preceding month, the list grew by approximately 35,000 names. Of these, 23,000 were verified through a leak from Russia's civil registry (ЗАГС, ZAGS): the Manticora service obtained death certificates indicating Ukraine or Russian border regions as the place of death, which were then matched against the project's accumulated archive. An interactive map linking casualties to 27,000 localities was also added; previously only region-level filtering had been available.

== Recognition ==
In February 2025, the project received the Redkollegia Prize, with the award going to Dmitry Treshchanin, David Frenkel, and the Mediazona editorial team.

In December 2025, the project was included in Meduza's annual selection of the best Russian-language journalism of the year ("Rizhsky Balzam").

In March 2026, the project was shortlisted for the Sigma Awards 2026, an international data journalism prize hosted by the Global Investigative Journalism Network.

== Similar projects ==
Comparable crowdsourced projects track casualties on the Ukrainian side. Bessudnov mentions "UALosses" and "War Tears" among them; he notes that the statistical model used by the latter inflates the figures presented on its website.

== See also ==
- iCasualties.org
- We Are Not Numbers
