= Casualties of the Iraq War =

Casualties of conflict from 2003 to 2011

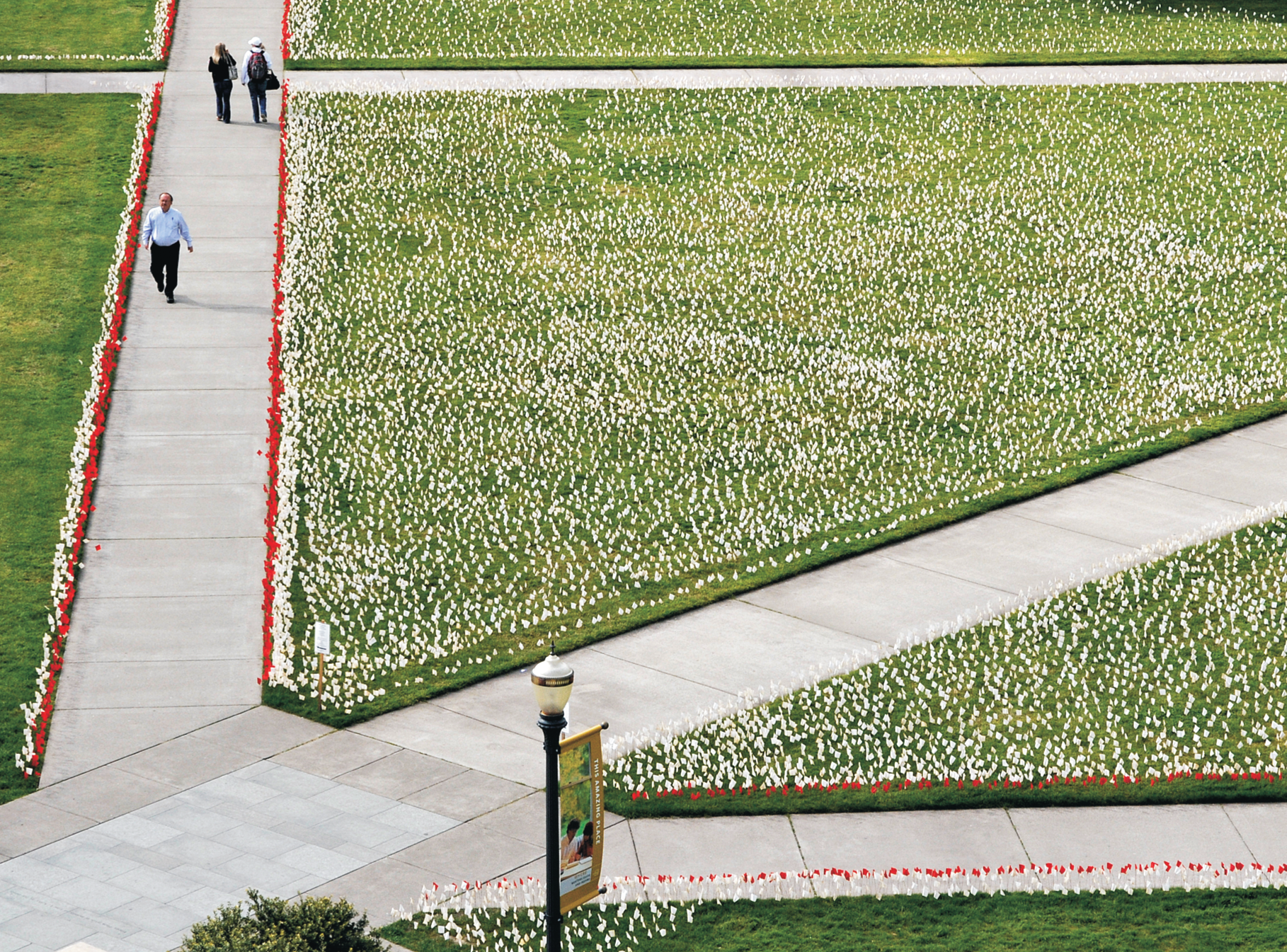
White and red flags, representing Iraqi and American deaths, respectively, sit in the grass quadrangle of The Valley Library on the Corvallis, Oregon, campus of Oregon State University. As part of the traveling Iraq Body Count exhibit from 2008 to 2009 (not related to Iraq Body Count project), the flags aim to "raise awareness of the human cost of the Iraq War." (May 2008)

Estimates of the casualties from the Iraq War (beginning with the 2003 invasion of Iraq, and the ensuing occupation and insurgency and civil war) have come in several forms, and those estimates of different types of Iraq War casualties vary greatly.

Estimating war-related deaths poses many challenges. Experts distinguish between population-based studies, which extrapolate from random samples of the population, and body counts, which tally reported deaths and likely significantly underestimate casualties. Population-based studies produce estimates of the number of Iraq War casualties ranging from 151,000 violent deaths as of June 2006 (per the Iraq Family Health Survey) to 1,033,000 excess deaths (per the 2007 Opinion Research Business (ORB) survey). Other survey-based studies covering different time-spans find 461,000 total deaths (over 60% of them violent) as of June 2011 (per PLOS Medicine 2013), and 655,000 total deaths (over 90% of them violent) as of June 2006 (per the 2006 Lancet study). Body counts counted at least 110,600 violent deaths as of April 2009 (Associated Press). The Iraq Body Count project documents 186,901–210,296 violent civilian deaths in their table. All estimates of Iraq War casualties are disputed.

== Tables ==
The tables below summarize reports on Iraqi casualty figures.

Scientific surveys:

Source	Estimated violent deaths	Time period
Iraq Family Health Survey	151,000 violent deaths	March 2003 to June 2006
Lancet survey	601,027 violent deaths out of 654,965 excess deaths	March 2003 to June 2006
PLOS Medicine Survey	460,000 deaths in Iraq as direct or indirect result of the war including more than 60% of deaths directly attributable to violence.	March 2003 to June 2011

Body counts:

Source	Documented deaths from violence	Time period
Associated Press	110,600 violent deaths.	March 2003 to April 2009
Iraq Body Count project	186,901 – 210,296 civilian deaths from violence.	March 2003 onwards
Classified Iraq War Logs	109,032 deaths including 66,081 civilian deaths.	January 2004 to December 2009

Overview: Iraqi death estimates by source Summary of casualties of the Iraq War. Possible estimates on the number of people killed in the invasion and occupation of Iraq vary widely, and are highly disputed. Estimates of casualties below include both the 2003 invasion of Iraq and the following Post-invasion Iraq, 2003–present.

Iraq war logs	Classified US military documents released by WikiLeaks in October 2010, record Iraqi and Coalition military deaths between January 2004 and December 2009. The documents record 109,032 deaths broken down into "Civilian" (66,081 deaths), "Host Nation" (15,196 deaths), "Enemy" (23,984 deaths), and "Friendly" (3,771 deaths).
Iraqi Health Ministry	The Health Ministry of the Iraqi government recorded 87,215 Iraqi violent deaths between January 1, 2005, and February 28, 2009. The data was in the form of a list of yearly totals for death certificates issued for violent deaths by hospitals and morgues. The official who provided the data told the Associated Press said the ministry does not have figures for the first two years of the war, and estimated the actual number of deaths at 10 to 20 percent higher because of thousands who are still missing and civilians who were buried in the chaos of war without official records.
The Associated Press	Associated Press stated that more than 110,600 Iraqis had been killed since the start of the war to April 2009. This number is per the Health Ministry tally of 87,215 covering January 1, 2005, to February 28, 2009 combined with counts of casualties for 2003–2004, and after February 29, 2009, from hospital sources and media reports. For more info see farther down at The Associated Press and Health Ministry (2009).
Iraq Body Count	The Iraq Body Count project (IBC) figure of documented civilian deaths from violence is 183,535 – 206,107 through April 2019. This includes reported civilian deaths due to Coalition and insurgent military action, sectarian violence and increased criminal violence. The IBC site states: "many deaths will probably go unreported or unrecorded by officials and media."
Iraq Family Health Survey	Iraq Family Health Survey for the World Health Organization. On January 9, 2008, the World Health Organization reported the results of the "Iraq Family Health Survey" published in The New England Journal of Medicine. The study surveyed 9,345 households across Iraq and estimated 151,000 deaths due to violence (95% uncertainty range, 104,000 to 223,000) from March 2003 through June 2006. Employees of the Iraqi Health Ministry carried out the survey. See also farther down: Iraq Family Health Survey (IFHS, 2008).
Opinion Research Business	Opinion Research Business (ORB) poll conducted August 12–19, 2007, estimated 1,033,000 violent deaths due to the Iraq War. The range given was 946,000 to 1,120,000 deaths. A nationally representative sample of approximately 2,000 Iraqi adults answered whether any members of their household (living under their roof) were killed due to the Iraq War. 22% of the respondents had lost one or more household members. ORB reported that "48% died from a gunshot wound, 20% from the impact of a car bomb, 9% from aerial bombardment, 6% as a result of an accident and 6% from another blast/ordnance."
United Nations	The United Nations reported that 34,452 violent deaths occurred in 2006, based on data from morgues, hospitals, and municipal authorities across Iraq.
Lancet studies	The Lancet study's figure of 654,965 excess deaths through the end of June 2006 is based on household survey data. The estimate is for all excess violent and nonviolent deaths. That also includes those due to increased lawlessness, degraded infrastructure, poorer healthcare, etc. 601,027 deaths (range of 426,369 to 793,663 using a 95% confidence interval) were estimated to be due to violence. 31% of those were attributed to the Coalition, 24% to others, 46% unknown. The causes of violent deaths were gunshot (56%), car bomb (13%), other explosion/ordnance (14%), airstrike (13%), accident (2%), unknown (2%). A copy of a death certificate was available for a high proportion of the reported deaths (92% of those households asked to produce one).
PLOS Medicine Study	The PLOS Medicine study's figure of approximately 460,000 excess deaths through the end of June 2011 is based on household survey data including more than 60% of deaths directly attributable to violence. The estimate is for all excess violent and nonviolent deaths. That also includes those due to increased lawlessness, degraded infrastructure, poorer healthcare, etc. 405,000 deaths (range of 48,000 to 751,000 using a 95% confidence interval) were estimated as excess deaths attributable to the conflict. They estimated at least 55,000 additional deaths occurred that the survey missed, as the families had migrated out of Iraq. The survey found that more than 60% of excess deaths were caused by violence, with the rest caused indirectly by the war, through degradation of infrastructure and similar causes. The survey notes that although car bombs received more significant press internationally, gunshot wounds were responsible for the majority (63%) of violent deaths. The study also estimated that 35% of violent deaths were attributed to the Coalition, and 32% to militias. Cardiovascular conditions accounted for about half (47%) of nonviolent deaths, chronic illnesses 11%, infant or childhood deaths other than injuries 12.4%, non-war injuries 11%, and cancer 8%.
Ali al-Shemari (previous Iraqi Health Minister)	Concerning war-related deaths (civilian and non-civilian), and deaths from criminal gangs, Iraq's Health Minister Ali al-Shemari said that since the March 2003 invasion between 100,000 and 150,000 Iraqis had been killed. "Al-Shemari said on Thursday [November 9, 2006] that he based his figure on an estimate of 100 bodies per day brought to morgues and hospitals – though such a calculation would come out closer to 130,000 in total." For more info see farther down at Iraq Health Minister estimate in November 2006.
Costs of War Project	268,000 - 295,000 people were killed in violence in the Iraq war from March 2003 - Oct. 2018, including 182,272 - 204,575 civilians (using Iraq Body Count's figures), according to the findings of the Costs of War Project, a team of 35 scholars, legal experts, human rights practitioners, and physicians, assembled by Brown University and the Watson Institute for International and Public Affairs, "about the costs of the post-9/11 wars in Iraq and Afghanistan, and the related violence in Pakistan and Syria." The civilian violent death numbers are "surely an underestimate."

Overview: Death estimates by group

Iraqi Security Forces (aligned with Coalition)	From June 2003, through December 31, 2010, there have been 16,623 Iraqi military and police killed based on several estimates. The Iraq Index of the Brookings Institution keeps a running total of ISF casualties. There is also a breakdown of ISF casualties at the iCasualties.org website.
Iraqi insurgents	From June 2003, through September 30, 2011, there have been 26,320-27,000+ Iraqi insurgents killed based on several estimates.
Media and aid workers	136 journalists and 51 media support workers were killed on duty according to the numbers listed on source pages on February 24, 2009. (See Category:Journalists killed while covering the Iraq War.) 94 aid workers have been killed according to a November 21, 2007, Reuters article.
U.S. armed forces	Graph of monthly deaths of U.S. military personnel in Iraq from beginning of war to June 24, 2008. As of July 19, 2021, according to the U.S. Department of Defense casualty website, there were 4,431 total deaths (including both killed in action and non-hostile) and 31,994 wounded in action (WIA) as a result of the Iraq War. As a part of Operation New Dawn, which was initiated on September 1, 2010, there were 74 total deaths (including KIA and non-hostile) and 298 WIA. See the references for a breakdown of the wounded, injured, ill, those returned to duty (RTD), those requiring medical air transport, non-hostile-related medical air transports, non-hostile injuries, diseases, or other medical reasons.
Coalition deaths by hostile fire	As of 23 October 2011, hostile-fire deaths accounted for 3,777 of the 4,799 total coalition military deaths.
Armed forces of other coalition countries	See Multinational force in Iraq. As of 24 February 2009, there were 318 deaths from the armed forces of other Coalition nations. 179 UK deaths and 139 deaths from other nations. Breakdown: Australia – 2; Azerbaijan – 1; Bulgaria – 13; Czech Republic – 1; Denmark – 7; El Salvador – 5; Estonia – 2; Fiji – 1; Georgia – 5; Hungary – 1; Italy – 33; Kazakhstan – 1; Latvia – 3; Netherlands – 2; Poland – 30; Portugal – 1; Romania – 4; Slovakia – 4; South Korea – 1; Spain – 11; Thailand – 2; Ukraine – 18; United Kingdom – 179
Contractors	Contractors. At least 1,487 deaths between March 2003 and June 2011 according to the list of private contractor deaths in Iraq. 245 of those are from the U.S. Contractors are "Americans, Iraqis and workers from more than three dozen other countries." 10,569 wounded or injured. Contractors "cook meals, do laundry, repair infrastructure, translate documents, analyze intelligence, guard prisoners, protect military convoys, deliver water in the heavily fortified Green Zone and stand sentry at buildings – often highly dangerous duties almost identical to those performed by many U.S. troops." A July 4, 2007, Los Angeles Times article reported 182,000 employees of U.S.-government-funded contractors and subcontractors (118,000 Iraqi, 43,000 other, 21,000 U.S.).

Overview: Iraqi injury estimates by source

Iraqi Human Rights Ministry	The Human Rights Ministry of the Iraqi government recorded 250,000 Iraqi injuries between 2003 and 2012. The ministry had earlier reported that 147,195 injuries were recorded for the period 2004–2008.
Iraqi Government	Iraqi Government spokesman Ali al-Dabbagh reported that 239,133 Iraqi injuries were recorded by the government between 2004 and 2011.
Iraq war logs	Classified US military documents released by WikiLeaks in October 2010, recorded 176,382 injuries, including 99,163 civilian injuries between January 2004 and December 2009.
Iraq Body Count	The Iraq Body Count project reported that there were at least 20,000 civilian injuries in the earliest months of the war between March and July 2003. A follow-up report noted that at least 42,500 civilians were reported wounded in the first two years of the war between March 2003 and March 2005.
UN Assistance Mission for Iraq	The United Nations Assistance Mission for Iraq (UNAMI) reported that there were 36,685 Iraqi injuries during the year 2006.
Iraqi Health Ministry	The Health Ministry of the Iraqi government reported that 38,609 Iraqi injuries had occurred during the year 2007, based on statistics derived from official Iraqi health departments' records. Baghdad had the highest number of injuries (18,335), followed by Nineveh (6,217), Basra (1,387) and Kirkuk (655).

== Additional statistics for the Iraq War ==
Overview of casualties by type
(see the rest of the article below for more info)
Dead
- Iraqis:
- Deadliest single insurgent bombings:
  - August 14, 2007. Truck bombs – 2007 Yazidi communities bombings (in northwestern Iraq):
    - 796 killed.
- Other deadly days:
  - November 23, 2006, (281 killed) and April 18, 2007, (233 killed):
    - "4 bombings in Baghdad kill at least 183. ... Nationwide, the number of people killed or found dead on Wednesday [, April 18, 2007, ] was 233, which was the second deadliest day in Iraq since Associated Press began keeping records in May 2005. Five car bombings, mortar rounds and other attacks killed 281 people across Iraq on November 23, 2006, according to the AP count."

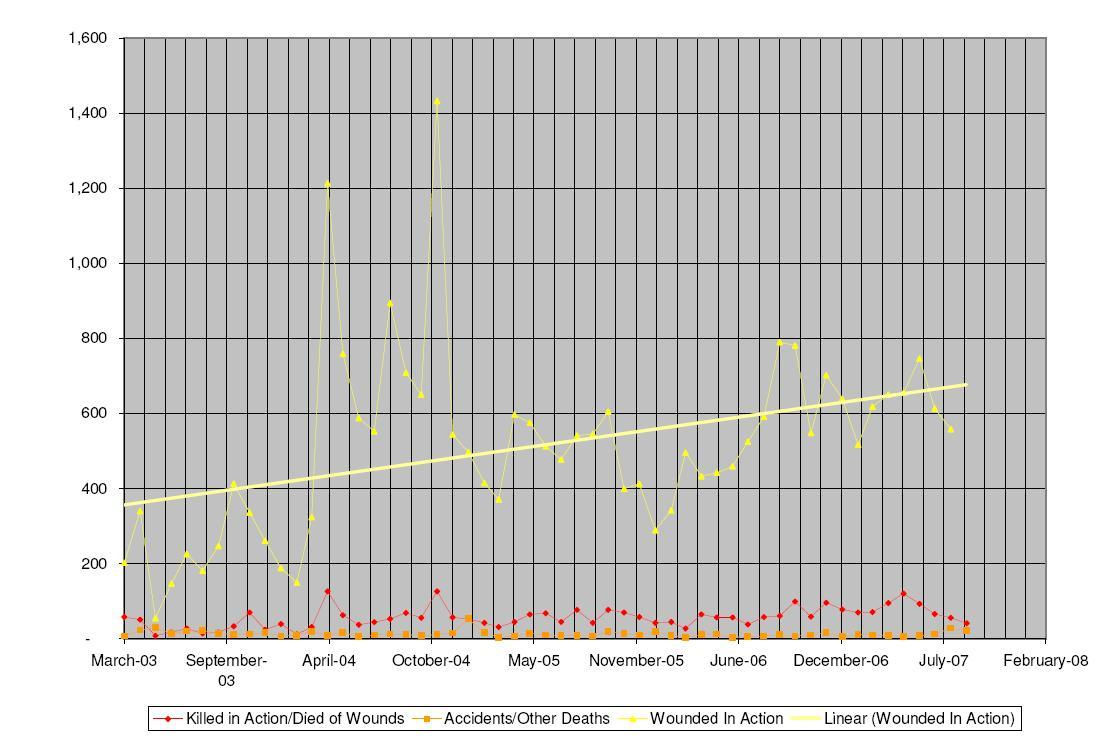
Graph of monthly wounded in action of U.S. military personnel in Iraq.

Wounded in action
- As of January 12, 2007, 500 U.S. troops have undergone amputations due to the Iraq War. Toes and fingers are not counted.
- As of September 30, 2006, 725 American troops have had limbs amputated from wounds received in Iraq and Afghanistan.
- A 2006 study by the Walter Reed Medical Center, which serves more critically injured soldiers than most VA hospitals, concluded that 62 percent of patients there had suffered a brain injury.
- In March 2003, U.S. military personnel were wounded in action at a rate averaging about 350 per month. As of September 2007, this rate has increased to about 675 per month.
Injured/fallen ill
- U.S. military: number unknown.
  - An October 18, 2005, USA Today article reports:
    - "More than one in four U.S. troops have come home from the Iraq war with health problems that require medical or mental health treatment, according to The Pentagon's first detailed screening of service members leaving a war zone."
- Iraqi combatants: number unknown
Refugees
- As of November 4, 2006, the United Nations High Commissioner for Refugees estimated that 1.8 million Iraqis had been displaced to neighboring countries, and 1.6 million were displaced internally, with nearly 100,000 Iraqis fleeing to Syria and Jordan each month.

== Iraqi invasion casualties ==
Franks reportedly estimated soon after the invasion that there had been 30,000 Iraqi casualties as of April 9, 2003. That number comes from the transcript of an October 2003 interview of U.S. Defense Secretary Donald Rumsfeld with journalist Bob Woodward. But neither could remember the number clearly, nor whether it was just for deaths, or both deaths and wounded.

A May 28, 2003, Guardian article reported that "Extrapolating from the death-rates of between 3% and 10% found in the units around Baghdad, one reaches a toll of between 13,500 and 45,000 dead among troops and paramilitaries."

An October 20, 2003, study by the Project on Defense Alternatives at Commonwealth Institute in Cambridge, Massachusetts, estimated that for March 19, 2003, to April 30, 2003, the "probable death of approximately 11,000 to 15,000 Iraqis, including approximately 3,200 to 4,300 civilian noncombatants."

The Iraq Body Count project (IBC) documented a higher number of civilian deaths up to the end of the major combat phase (May 1, 2003). In a 2005 report, using updated information, the IBC reported that 7,299 civilians are documented to have been killed, primarily by U.S. air and ground forces. There were 17,338 civilian injuries inflicted up to May 1, 2003. The IBC says its figures are probably underestimates because: "many deaths will probably go unreported or unrecorded by officials and media."

== Iraqi civilian casualties ==
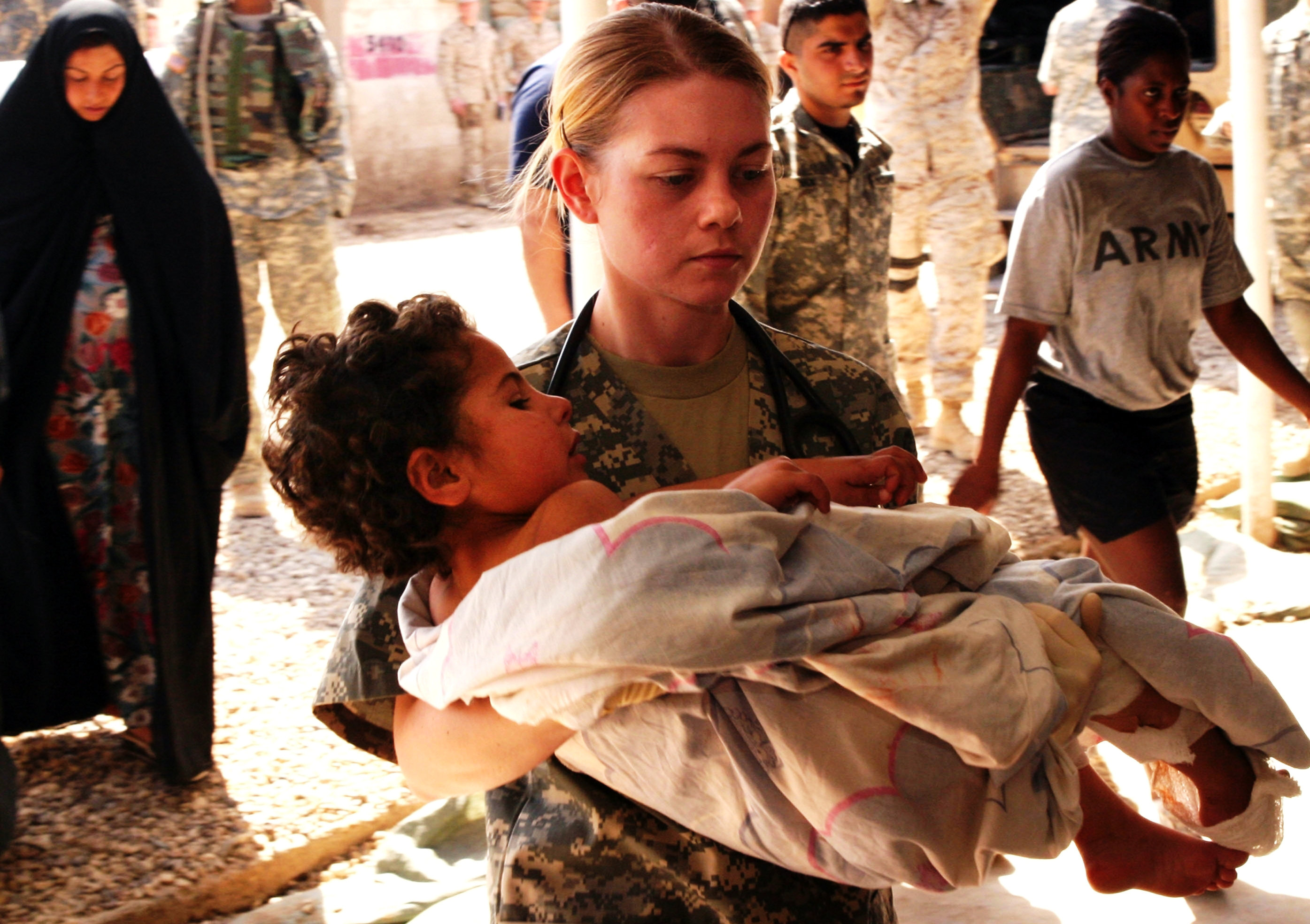
A soldier carries a wounded Iraqi child into the Charlie Medical Centre at Camp Ramadi, Iraq (March 20, 2007).

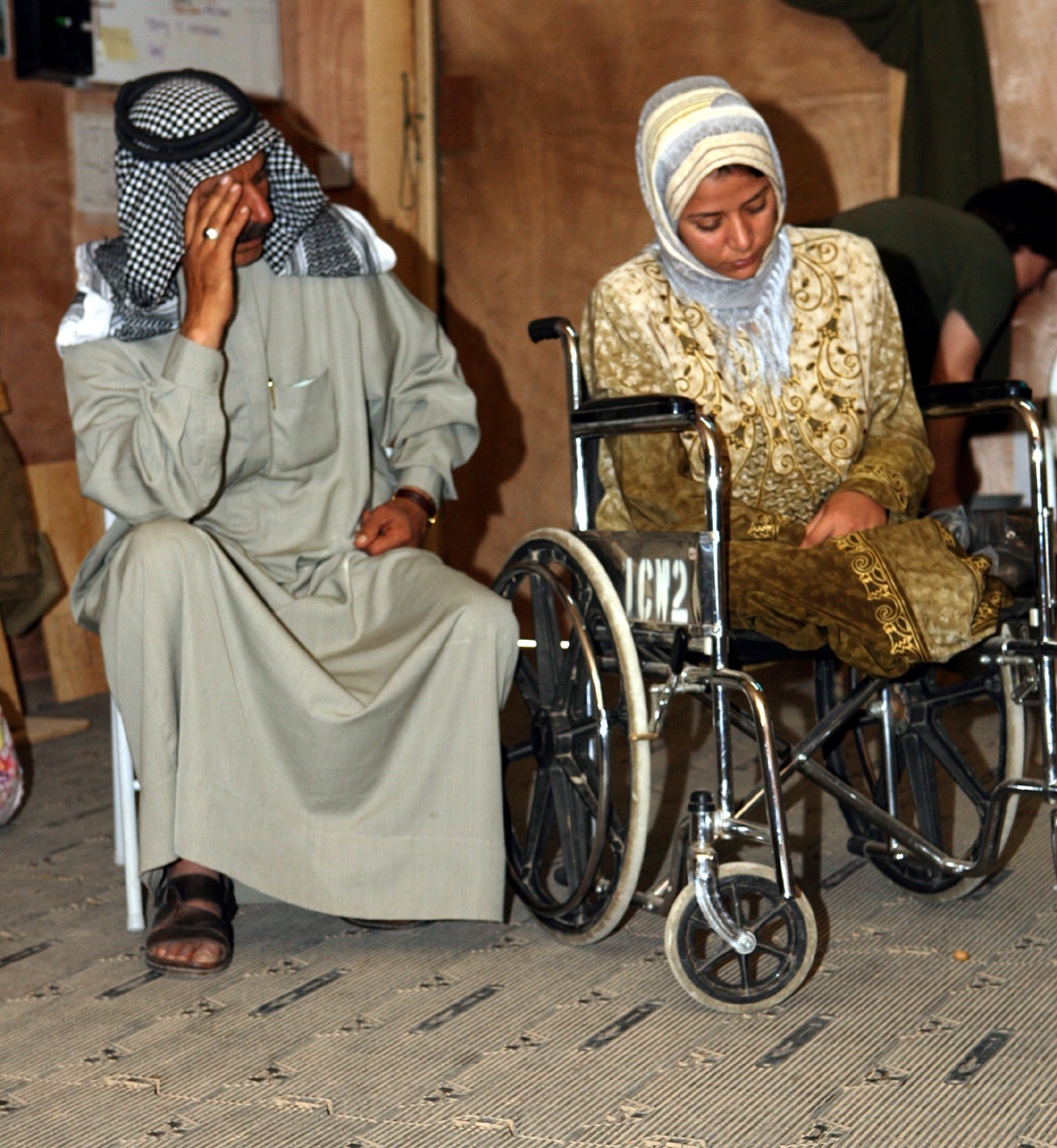
A disabled 28-year-old Iraqi woman lost both of her legs during combat operations (May 7, 2006)

=== Iraq Body Count project (IBC) ===
An independent British-American group, the Iraq Body Count project (IBC project) compiles reported Iraqi civilian deaths resulting from war since the 2003 invasion and ensuing insurgency and civil war, including those caused directly by coalition military action, Iraqi military actions, the Iraqi insurgency, and those resulting from excess crime. The IBC maintains that the occupying authority has a responsibility to prevent these deaths under international law.

The Iraq Body Count (IBC) project has recorded a range of at least 185,194 – 208,167 total violent civilian deaths through June 2020 in their database. The IBC project records its numbers based on a "comprehensive survey of commercial media and NGO-based reports, along with official records that have been released into the public sphere. Reports range from specific, incident based accounts to figures from hospitals, morgues, and other documentary data-gathering agencies." The IBC was also given access to the WikiLeaks disclosures of the Iraq War Logs.

Iraq Body Count project data shows that the type of attack that resulted in the most civilian deaths was execution after abduction or capture. These accounted for 33% of civilian deaths and 29% of these deaths involved torture. The following most common causes of death were small arms gunfire at 20%, suicide bombs at 14%, vehicle bombs at 9%, roadside bombs at 5%, and air attacks at 5%.

The IBC project, reported that by the end of the major combat phase of the invasion period up to April 30, 2003, 7,419 civilians had been killed, primarily by U.S. air-and-ground forces.

The IBC project released a report detailing the deaths it recorded between March 2003 and March 2005 in which it recorded 24,865 civilian deaths. The report says the U.S. and its allies were responsible for the largest share (37%) with 9,270 deaths. The remaining deaths were attributed to anti-occupation forces (9%), crime (36%) and unknown agents (11%). It also lists the primary sources used by the media – mortuaries, medics, Iraqi officials, eyewitnesses, police, relatives, U.S.-coalition, journalists, non-governmental organizations (NGOs), friends/associates and other.

According to a 2010 assessment by John Sloboda, director of Iraq Body Count, 150,000 people including 122,000 civilians were killed in the Iraq War with U.S. and Coalition forces responsible for at least 22,668 insurgents as well as 13,807 civilians, with the rest of the civilians killed by insurgents, militias, or terrorists.

The IBC project has been criticized by some, including scholars, who believe it counts only a small percentage of the number of actual deaths because of its reliance on media sources. The IBC project's director, John Sloboda, has stated, "We've always said our work is an undercount, you can't possibly expect that a media-based analysis will get all the deaths." However, the IBC project rejects many of these criticisms as exaggerated or misinformed.

According to a 2013 Lancet article, the Iraq Body Count is "a non-peer-reviewed but innovative online and media-centred approach that passively counted non-combatant civilian deaths as they were recorded in the media and available morgue reports. In passive surveillance no special effort is made to find those deaths that go unreported. The volunteer staff collecting data for the IBC have risked criticism that their data are inherently biased because of scarcity or absence of independent verification, variation in original sources of information, and underestimation of mortality from violence... In research circles, random cross-sectional cluster sampling survey methods are deemed to be a more rigorous epidemiological method in conflict settings."

==== Civilian deaths by perpetrator ====
In 2011, the IBC published data in PLOS Medicine on 2003-2008 civilian deaths in Iraq by perpetrator and cause of death. The study broke down civilian deaths by perpetrator into the following categories:

- 74% unidentified perpetrator: defined as "those who target civilians (i.e., no identifiable military target is present), while appearing indistinguishable from civilians: for example, a suicide bomber disguised as a civilian in a market. Unknown (i.e., unidentified) perpetrators in Iraq include sectarian combatants and Anti-Coalition combatants who maintain a civilian appearance while targeting civilians."
- 11% anti-coalition forces: defined as "un-uniformed combatants identified by attacks on coalition targets" during the event. Anti-Coalition combatants in the event of targeting purely civilians would instead be classed under the "unidentified perpetrator" category.
- 12% coalition forces: identified by uniforms or use of air attacks.

=== IBC table of violent civilian deaths ===
Following are the yearly IBC Project violent civilian death totals, broken down by month from the beginning of 2003. Table below is copied irregularly from the source page, and is soon out-of-date as data is continually updated at the source. As of June 12, 2023 the top of the IBC database page with the table says 186,901 – 210,296 "Documented civilian deaths from violence". That page also says: "Gaps in recording and reporting suggest that even our highest totals to date may be missing many civilian deaths from violence."

Monthly civilian deaths from violence, 2003 onwards
	Jan	Feb	Mar	Apr	May	Jun	Jul	Aug	Sep	Oct	Nov	Dec	Yearly totals
2003	3	2	3986	3448	545	597	646	833	566	515	487	524	12,152
2004	610	663	1004	1303	655	910	834	878	1042	1033	1676	1129	11,737
2005	1222	1297	905	1145	1396	1347	1536	2352	1444	1311	1487	1141	16,583
2006	1546	1579	1957	1805	2279	2594	3298	2865	2567	3041	3095	2900	29,526
2007	3035	2680	2728	2573	2854	2219	2702	2483	1391	1326	1124	997	26,112
2008	861	1093	1669	1317	915	755	640	704	612	594	540	586	10,286
2009	372	409	438	590	428	564	431	653	352	441	226	478	5,382
2010	267	305	336	385	387	385	488	520	254	315	307	218	4,167
2011	389	254	311	289	381	386	308	401	397	366	288	392	4,162
2012	531	356	377	392	304	529	469	422	400	290	253	299	4,622
2013	357	360	403	545	888	659	1145	1013	1306	1180	870	1126	9,852
2014	1097	972	1029	1037	1100	4088	1580	3340	1474	1738	1436	1327	20,218
2015	1490	1625	1105	2013	1295	1355	1845	1991	1445	1297	1021	1096	17,578
2016	1374	1258	1459	1192	1276	1405	1280	1375	935	1970	1738	1131	16,393
2017	1119	982	1918	1816	1871	1858	1498	597	490	397	346	291	13,183
2018	474	410	402	303	229	209	230	201	241	305	160	155	3,319
2019	323	271	123	140	167	130	145	93	151	361	274	215	2,393
2020	114	148	73	52	74	64	49	82	54	70	74	54	908
2021	64	56	49	66	49	46	87	60	41	65	23	63	669
2022	62	46	42	31	82	44	67	80	68	63	65	90	740
2023	56	52	76	85	45								314

=== People's Kifah ===
The Iraqi political party People's Kifah, or Struggle Against Hegemony (PK) said that its survey conducted between March and June 2003 throughout the non-Kurdish areas of Iraq tallied 36,533 civilians killed in those areas by June 2003. While detailed town-by-town totals were given by the PK spokesperson, details of methodology are very thin and raw data is not in the public domain. A still-less-detailed report on this study appeared some months later on Al Jazeera's website, and covered casualties up to October 2003.

== Iraqi refugees crisis ==
Roughly 40 percent of Iraq's middle class is believed to have fled, the U.N. reported in 2007. Most are fleeing systematic persecution and have no desire to return. All kinds of people, from university professors to bakers, have been targeted by militias, Iraqi insurgents and criminals. An estimated 331 school teachers were slain in the first four months of 2006, according to Human Rights Watch, and at least 2,000 Iraqi doctors have been killed and 250 kidnapped since the 2003 U.S. invasion.

== Coalition military casualties ==
Coalition deaths in Iraq by country

USA: 4,492
UK: 179
Italy: 33
Poland: 23
Ukraine: 18
Bulgaria: 13
Spain: 11
Denmark: 7
El Salvador: 5
Georgia: 5
Slovakia: 4
Latvia: 3
Romania: 3
Australia: 2
Estonia: 2
Netherlands: 2
Thailand: 2
Azerbaijan: 1
Czech Republic: 1
Fiji: 1
Hungary: 1
Kazakhstan: 1
South Korea: 1

TOTAL: 4,810

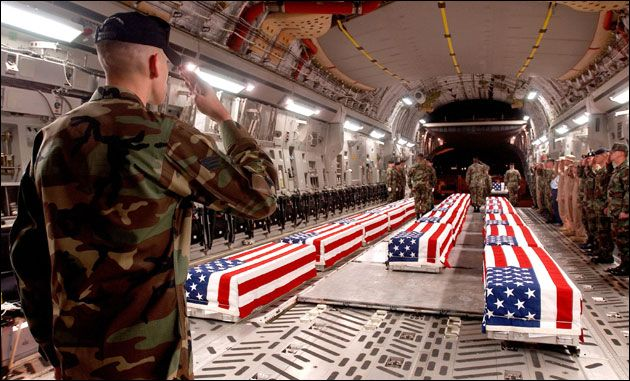
Most U.S. casualties, like these in a C-17 military transport aircraft, return to Dover Air Force Base in Dover, Delaware. (unknown date)

For the latest casualty numbers see the overview chart at the top of the page.

Since the official handover of power to the Iraqi Interim Government on June 28, 2004, coalition soldiers have continued to come under attack in towns across Iraq.

National Public Radio, iCasualties.org, and GlobalSecurity.org have month-by-month charts of American troop deaths in the Iraq War.

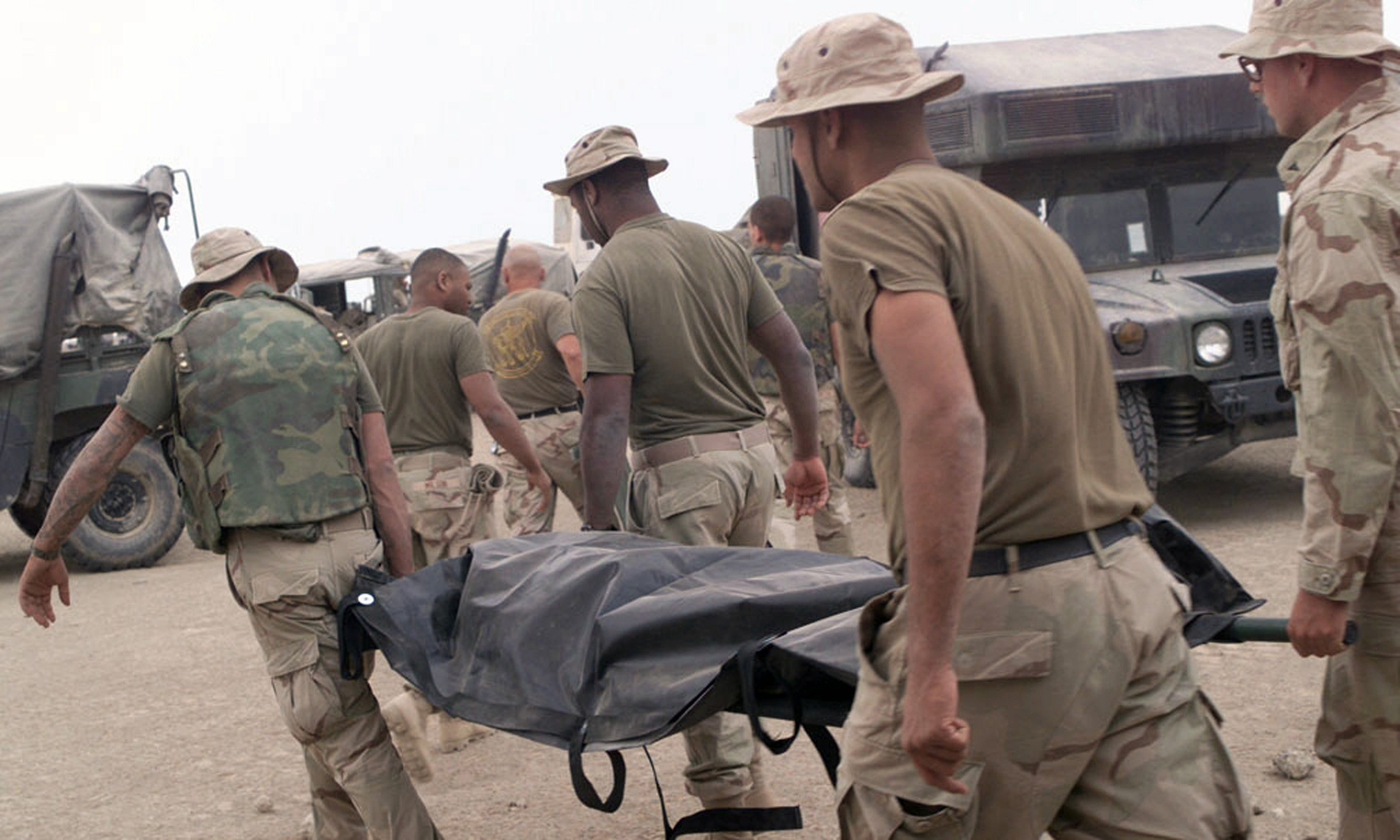
A U.S. Marine killed in April 2003 is carried away after receiving his Last Rites.

The combined total of coalition and contractor casualties in the conflict is now over ten times that of the 1990–1991 Gulf War. In the Gulf War, coalition forces suffered around 378 deaths, and among the Iraqi military, tens of thousands were killed, along with thousands of civilians.

=== Troops fallen ill, injured, or wounded ===
See the overview chart at the top of the page for recent numbers.

On August 29, 2006, The Christian Science Monitor reported: "Because of new body armor and advances in military medicine, for example, the ratio of combat-zone deaths to those wounded has dropped from 24 percent in Vietnam to 13 percent in Iraq and Afghanistan. In other words, the numbers of those killed as a percentage of overall casualties is lower."

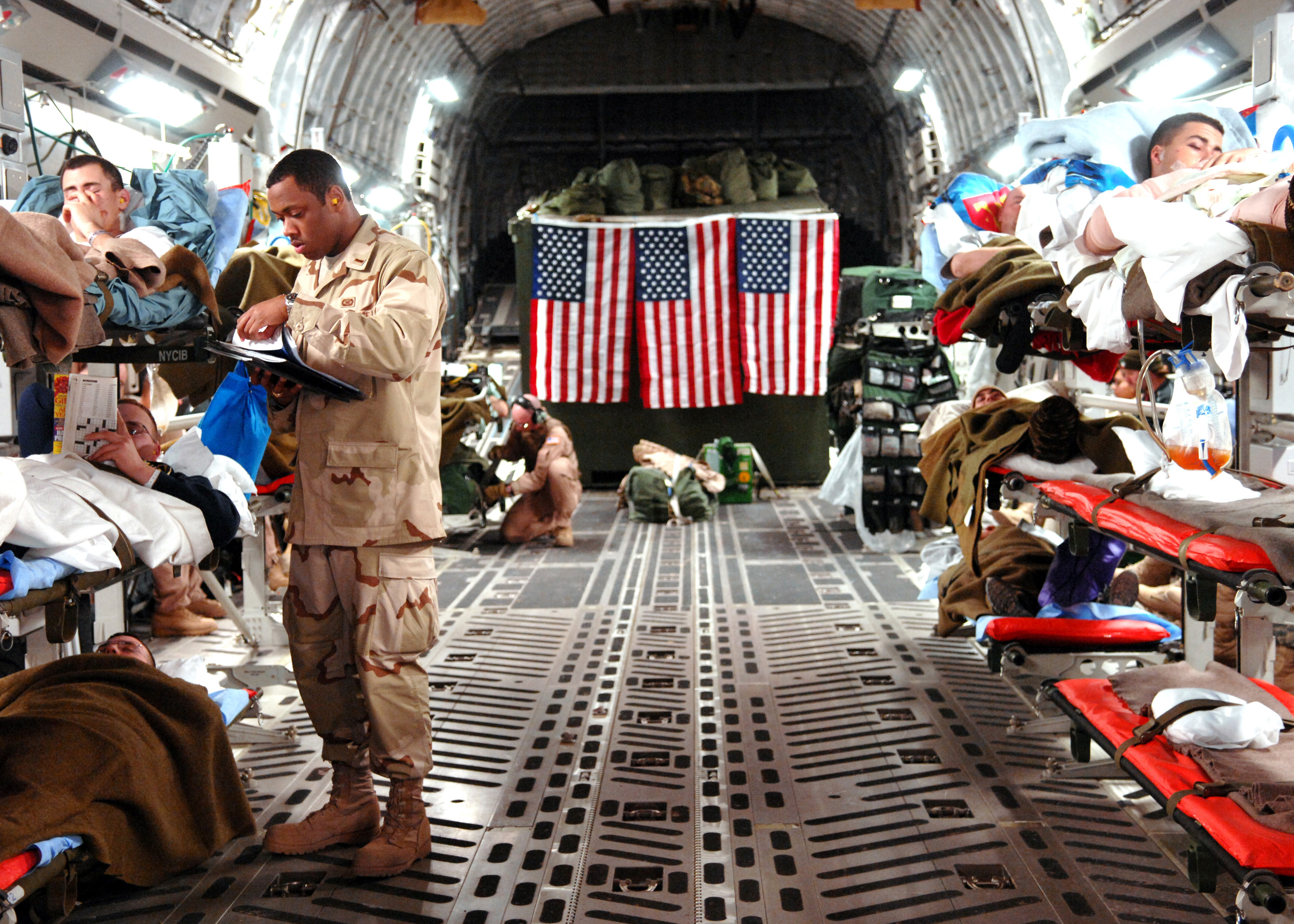
Wounded U.S. personnel flown from Iraq to Ramstein Air Base, Germany, for medical treatment. (February 2007)

Many U.S. veterans of the Iraq War have reported a range of serious health issues, including tumors, daily blood in urine and stool, sexual dysfunction, migraines, frequent muscle spasms, and other symptoms similar to the debilitating symptoms of "Gulf War syndrome" reported by many veterans of the 1991 Gulf War, which some believe is related to the U.S.'s use of radioactive depleted uranium.

A study of U.S. veterans published in July 2004 in The New England Journal of Medicine on posttraumatic stress disorder (PTSD) and other mental disorders in Iraq and Afghanistan veterans found that 5 percent to 9.4 percent (depending on the strictness of the PTSD definition used) suffered from PTSD before deployment. After deployment, 6.2 percent to 19.9 percent suffered from PTSD. For the broad definition of PTSD that represents an increase of 10.5 percent (19.9 percent – 9.4 percent = 10.5 percent). That is 10,500 additional cases of PTSD for every 100,000 U.S. troops after they have served in Iraq. ePluribus Media, an independent citizen journalism collective, is tracking and cataloging press-reported possible, probable, or confirmed incidents of post-deployment or combat-zone cases in its PTSD Timeline.

Information on injuries suffered by troops of other coalition countries is less readily available, but a statement in Hansard indicated that 2,703 U.K. soldiers had been medically evacuated from Iraq for wounds or injuries as of October 4, 2004, and that 155 U.K. troops were wounded in combat in the initial invasion.

Leishmaniasis has been reported by U.S. troops stationed in Iraq, including visceral leishmaniasis. Leishmaniasis, spread by biting sand fleas, was diagnosed in hundreds of U.S. troops compared to just 32 during the first Gulf War.

=== Accidents and negligence ===
As of August 2008, sixteen American troops have died from accidental electrocutions in Iraq according to the Defense Department. One soldier had been electrocuted in a shower, while another had been electrocuted in a swimming pool. KBR, the contractor responsible, had been warned by employees of unsafe practices, and was criticised following the revelations.

=== Nightline controversy ===
Ted Koppel, host of ABC's Nightline, devoted his entire show on April 30, 2004, to reading the names of 721 of the 737 U.S. troops who had died thus far in Iraq. (The show had not been able to confirm the remaining sixteen names.) Claiming that the broadcast was "motivated by a political agenda designed to undermine the efforts of the United States in Iraq", the Sinclair Broadcast Group took the action of barring the seven ABC network-affiliated stations it controls from airing the show. The decision to censor the broadcast drew criticism from both sides, including members of the armed forces, opponents of the war, MoveOn.org, and most notably Republican U.S. Senator John McCain, who denounced the move as "unpatriotic" and "a gross disservice to the public".

=== Amputees ===
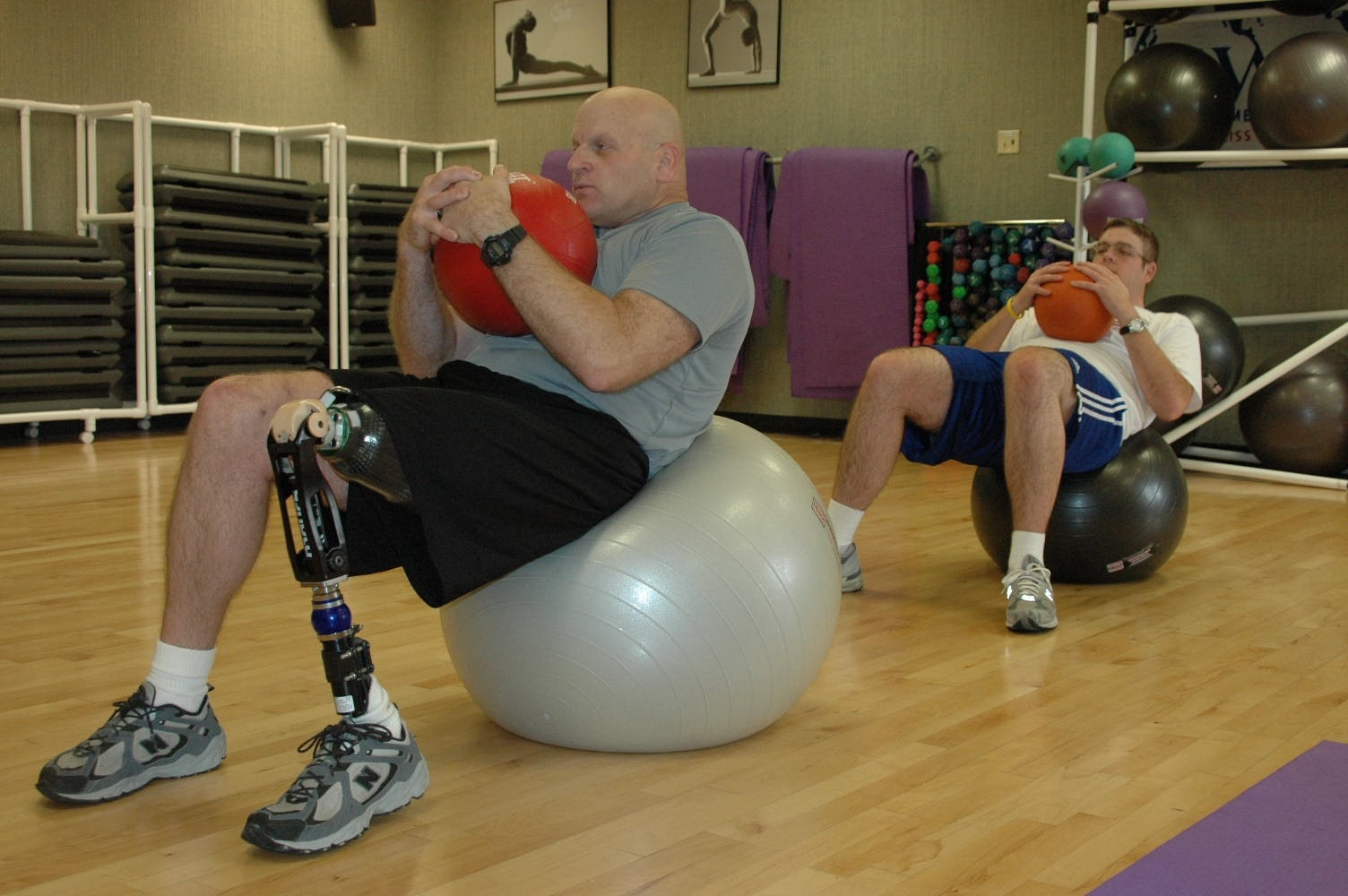
Amputee U.S. soldier (February 2007)

As of January 18, 2007, there were at least 500 American amputees due to the Iraq War. In 2016, the number was estimated to be 1,650 U.S. troops. The 2007 estimate suggests amputees represent 2.2% of the 22,700 U.S. troops wounded in action (5% for soldiers whose wounds prevented them returning to duty).

=== Traumatic brain injuries ===
By March 2009, the Pentagon estimated as many as 360,000 U.S. veterans of the Iraq and Afghanistan conflicts may have suffered traumatic brain injuries (TBI), including 45,000 to 90,000 veterans with persistent symptoms requiring specialized care.

In February 2007, one expert from the VA estimated that the number of undiagnosed TBIs were higher than 7,500.

According to USA Today, by November 2007 there were more than an estimated 20,000 US troops who had signs of brain injuries without being classified as wounded during combat in Iraq and Afghanistan.

=== Mental illness and suicide ===
A top U.S. Army psychiatrist, Colonel Charles Hoge, said in March 2008 that nearly 30% of troops on their third deployment suffered from serious mental-health problems, and that one year was not enough time between combat tours.

A March 12, 2007, Time article reported on a study published in the Archives of Internal Medicine. About one third of the 103,788 veterans returning from the Iraq and Afghanistan wars seen at U.S. Department of Veterans Affairs facilities between September 30, 2001, and September 30, 2005, were diagnosed with mental illness or a psycho-social disorder, such as homelessness and marital problems, including domestic violence. More than half of those diagnosed, 56 percent, were suffering from more than one disorder. The most common combination was post-traumatic stress disorder and depression.

In January 2008, the U.S. Army reported that the rate of suicide among soldiers in 2007 was the highest since the Army started counting in 1980. There were 121 suicides in 2007, a 20-percent jump over the prior year. Also, there were around 2100 attempted suicides and self-injuries in 2007. Other sources reveal higher estimates.

Time magazine reported on June 5, 2008:

Data contained in the Army's fifth Mental Health Advisory Team report indicate that, according to an anonymous survey of U.S. troops taken last fall, about 12% of combat troops in Iraq and 17% of those in Afghanistan are taking prescription antidepressants or sleeping pills to help them cope. ... About a third of soldiers in Afghanistan and Iraq say they can't see a mental-health professional when they need to. When the number of troops in Iraq surged by 30,000 last year, the number of Army mental-health workers remained the same – about 200 – making counseling and care even tougher to get.

In the same article Time also reported on some of the reasons for the prescription drug use:

That imbalance between seeing the price of war up close and yet not feeling able to do much about it, the survey suggests, contributes to feelings of "intense fear, helplessness or horror" that plant the seeds of mental distress. "A friend was liquefied in the driver's position on a tank, and I saw everything", was a typical comment. Another: "A huge f______ bomb blew my friend's head off like 50 meters from me." Such indelible scenes – and wondering when and where the next one will happen – are driving thousands of soldiers to take antidepressants, military psychiatrists say. It's not hard to imagine why.

Concern has been expressed by mental health professionals about the effects on the emotional health and development of returning veterans' infants and children, due to the increased rates of interpersonal violence, posttraumatic stress, depression, and substance abuse that have been reported among these veterans. Moreover, the stressful effects of physical casualties and loss pose enormous stress for the primary caregiver that can adversely affect her or his parenting, as well as the couple's children directly. The mental health needs of military families in the aftermath of combat exposure and other war-related trauma have been thought likely to be inadequately addressed by the military health system that separates mental health care of the returning soldier from his or her family's care, the latter of whom is generally covered under a contracted, civilian managed-care system.

== Iraqi insurgent casualties ==
Total insurgent deaths are hard to estimate. In 2003, 597 insurgents were killed, according to the U.S. military. From January 2004 through December 2009 (not including May 2004 and March 2009), 23,984 insurgents were estimated to have been killed based on reports from Coalition soldiers on the frontlines. In the two missing months from the estimate, 652 were killed in May 2004, and 45 were killed in March 2009. In 2010, another 676 insurgents were killed. In January and March through October 2011, 451 insurgents were killed. Based on all of these estimates some 26,405 insurgents/militia were killed from 2003, up until late 2011.

However, this number could be low compared to reality as it only counts combat deaths against US-led forces; insurgents also frequently clashed between each other and those killed by noncombat causes are not counted. There have been contradictions between the figures released by the U.S. military and those released by the Iraqi government. For example, the U.S. military's number of insurgents killed in 2005, is 3,247, which is in contrast to the Iraqi government's figure of 1,734, however, fear of civilians fatalities, numbers were lowered. In 2007, 4,544 militants were killed according to the Iraqi ministries, while the U.S. military claimed 6,747 died. Also, in 2008, 2,028 insurgents were reported killed and in 2009, with the exception of the month of June, 488 were killed according to the Iraqi Defence Ministry. These numbers are also not in line with the U.S. military estimate of some 3,984 killed in 2008 and 2009.

U.S. military- and Iraqi Defence Ministry-provided numbers, including suicide bombers

- 2011 – 451 (not including February & August)
- 2010 – 676
- 2009 – 488 (not including June)
- 2008 – 2,028
- 2007 – 6,747 (U.S. military), 4,544 (Iraqi Defence Ministry)
- 2006 – 3,902
- 2005 – 3,247 (U.S. military), 1,734 (Iraqi Defence Ministry)
- 2004 – 6,801
- 2003 – 603

In addition as of August 22, 2009, approximately 1,719 suicide-bombers had also been reported killed.

- 2009 – 73
- 2008 – 257
- 2007 – 442
- 2006 – 297
- 2005 – 478
- 2004 – 140
- 2003 (from August to December) – 32

Grand total – 21,221–26,405 insurgents dead

On September 28, 2006, an Al Qaeda leader claimed that 4,000 foreign insurgents had been killed in the war.

On June 6, 2008, an Iraqi Army official revealed that about 6,000 Al Qaeda fighters were among the insurgents killed since the start of the war up until April 2008.

The US military also reported on the number of suspected insurgents who were detained, arrested, or captured. From June 2003 through August 2007 the US military reported that 119,752 were detained, compared to 18,832 that had been killed.

== Contractor casualties ==
By July 2007, the Department of Labor recorded 933 deaths of contractors in Iraq. By April 2007, the Special Inspector General for Iraq Reconstruction stated that the number of civilian contractor deaths on US-funded projects in Iraq was 916. In January 2007, the Houston Chronicle reported that the Pentagon did not track contractor deaths in Iraq. In January 2017, an estimated 7,761 contractors had been injured in Iraq, but their nationality was not known. By the end 2006, civilian contractors suffered "3,367 injuries serious enough to require four or more days off the job." The Labor Department had these numbers because it tracked workers' compensation claims by injured workers or families of slain contractors under the federal Defense Base Act.

== Health outcomes ==
By November 2006, there were reports of a significant deterioration of the Iraq health care system as a result of the war.

In 2007, an Iraqi Society of Psychiatrists and WHO study found that 70% of 10,000 primary school students in the Sha'ab section of north Baghdad are suffering from trauma-related symptoms.

Subsequent articles in The Lancet and Al Jazeera have suggested that the number of cases of birth defects, cancer, miscarriages, illnesses and premature births may have increased dramatically after the first and second Iraq wars, due to the presences of depleted uranium and chemicals introduced during American attacks, especially around Fallujah, Basra and Southern Iraq.

== Total Iraqi casualties ==
Estimates of the total number of Iraqi war-related deaths for certain periods of time are highly disputed.

=== Iraq Living Conditions Survey (2004) ===
A study commissioned by the United Nations Development Programme (UNDP), called the Iraq Living Conditions Survey (ILCS), sampled almost 22,000 households across all Iraqi provinces. It estimated 24,000 war-related violent deaths by May 2004 (with a 95 percent confidence interval from 18,000 to 29,000). This study did not attempt to measure what portion of its estimate was made up of civilians or combatants. It would include Iraqi military killed during the invasion, as well as "insurgents" or other fighters thereafter. This study has been criticized for various reasons. For more info see the section in Lancet surveys of Iraq War casualties that compares the Lancet and UNDP ILCS studies.

=== Lancet (2004) ===
The October 2004 Lancet study done by public health experts from Johns Hopkins University and published on October 29, 2004, in The Lancet medical journal, estimated that 100,000 "excess" Iraqi deaths from all causes had occurred since the U.S. invasion began. The study did not attempt to measure how many of these were civilian, but the study's authors have said they believe that the "vast majority" were non-combatants. To arrive at these excess death figures, a survey was taken from 988 Iraqi households in 33 clusters throughout Iraq, in which the residents were asked how many people lived there and how many births and deaths there had been since the war began. They then compared the death rate with the average from the 15 months before the war. Iraqis were found to be 1.5 times more likely to die from all causes after the invasion (rising from 0.5% to 0.79% per year) than in the 15 months preceding the war, producing an estimate of 98,000 excess deaths. This figure excluded data from one cluster in Falluja, which was deemed too much of an outlier for inclusion in the national estimate. If it included data from Falluja, which showed a higher rate of violent deaths than the other 32 clusters combined, the increased death rate would be raised from 1.5 to 2.5-fold, violent deaths would be 58 times more likely with most of them due to air-strikes by coalition forces, and an additional 200,000 fatalities would be estimated.

Reported casualties' demographics in the Lancet studies
Year	Study	Children (<15)	Women (15-59)	Men (15-59)	Elderly (>60)
2004	Violent deaths in all clusters (excluding Falluja)	19%	10%	62%	10%
2004	Violent deaths in the Falluja cluster	46%	6%	48%	0%
2006	Violent deaths in all clusters	9%	5%	78%	4%

=== Iraqiyun estimate (2005) ===
The Iraqi non-governmental organisation, Iraqiyun, estimated 128,000 deaths from the invasion until July 2005. A July 2005 United Press International (UPI) article said the number came from the chairman of the Iraqiyun humanitarian organization in Baghdad, Dr. Hatim al-'Alwani. He said 55 percent of those killed were women, and children aged 12 and under. The UPI article reported: "Iraqiyun obtained data from relatives and families of the deceased, as well as from Iraqi hospitals in all the country's provinces. The 128,000 figure only includes those whose relatives have been informed of their deaths and does not include those were abducted, assassinated or simply disappeared." A 2010 book by Nicolas Davies reported the Iraqiyun estimate, and that Iraqiyun was affiliated with the political party of Interim President Ghazi Al-Yawer. Davies wrote: "The report specified that it included only confirmed deaths reported to relatives, omitting significant numbers of people who had simply disappeared without trace amid the violence and chaos."

=== Lancet (2006) ===
The October 2006 Lancet study by Gilbert Burnham (of Johns Hopkins University) and co-authors estimated total excess deaths (civilian and non-civilian) related to the war of 654,965 excess deaths up to July 2006. The 2006 study was based on surveys conducted between May 20 and July 10, 2006. More households were surveyed than during the 2004 study, allowing for a 95% confidence interval of 392,979 to 942,636 excess Iraqi deaths. Those estimates were far higher than other available tallies at the time.

The Burnham et al. study has been described as the most controversial study in survey research on armed conflict, and its findings have been widely disputed in the academic literature. Shortly after publication, the study's estimate and methodology came under criticism from a number of sources, including the United States government, academics, and the Iraq Body Count. At the time, other experts praised the methodology of the study. John Tirman, who commissioned and directed the funding for the study defended the study. A 2008 systematic review of casualty estimates in the Iraq War in the journal Conflict and Health concluded that the highest quality studies have used "population-based methods" that have "yielded the highest estimates. A 2016 study described the Lancet study as seen "widely viewed among peers as the most rigorous investigations of Iraq War–related mortality among Iraqi civilians," and argued that part of the criticism "may have been politically motivated."

A number of peer-reviewed studies criticized the Lancet study on the basis of its methodology and exaggerated casualty numbers. The authors of the Lancet study were also accused of ethical breaches in terms of how the survey was conducted and in how the authors responded to requests for data and information. In 2009, the lead author of the Lancet study was censured by American Association for Public Opinion Research (AAPOR) for refusing to provide "several basic facts about" the study. AAPOR had over a 12-year period only formally censured two other individuals. In 2012, Michael Spagat noted that six peer-reviewed studies had identified shortcomings in the Lancet study, and that the Lancet authors had yet to make a substantive response to the critiques. According to Spagat, there is "ample reason" to discard Lancet study estimate. Columbia University statistician Andrew Gelman said in 2014 that "serious flaws have been demonstrated" in the Lancet study, and in 2015 that his impression was that the Lancet study "had pretty much been discredited". Joshua Goldstein, professor emeritus of International Relations at American University, wrote that critics of the study "have argued convincingly that the sample method was biased." According to University of Delaware sociologist Joel Best in his book Stat-Spotting: A Field Guide to Identifying Dubious Data, "it seems likely that [the Lancet estimate] was too large". Conflict scholars Nils Petter Gleditsch, Erik Melander and Henrik Urdal said there were "major biases" in the study, leading to oversampling of households affected by violence.

A 2008 study in the Journal of Peace Research found that the 2006 Lancet study may have considerably overestimated Iraq War casualties, that the study made "unusual" methodological choices, and called on the 2006 Lancet study authors to make all of their data available. The 2008 study was awarded "Article of the Year – 2008" by the Journal of Peace Research, with the jury of Lars-Erik Cederman (ETH Zürich), Jon Hovi (University of Oslo) and Sara McLaughlin Mitchell (University of Iowa) writing that the "authors show convincingly that previous studies which are based on a cross-street cluster-sampling algorithm (CSSA) have significantly overestimated the number of casualties in Iraq." American University political scientist Thomas Zeitzoff said the Journal of Peace Research study showed the Lancet study to be "wildly inaccurate" due to its reliance on information from biased samples.

Michael Spagat criticized the 2006 Lancet study in a 2010 article for the journal Defence and Peace Economics. Spagat wrote that he found "some evidence relating to data fabrication and falsification" and "this evidence suggests that this survey cannot be considered a reliable or valid contribution towards knowledge about the extent of mortality in Iraq since 2003". Spagat also chided the Lancet study for "ethical violations to the survey's respondents including endangerment, privacy breaches and violations in obtaining informed consent". In a letter to the journal Science, Spagat said that the Lancet study had failed replication in a study by the WHO (the Iraq Family Health Survey). Spagat noted that the lead author of the 2006 study had been censured by the American Association for Public Opinion Research for "repeatedly refusing to disclose the corresponding information for his survey".

The Iraq Family Health Survey published by WHO researchers in The New England Journal of Medicine found that the 2006 Lancet study results "considerably overestimated the number of violent deaths" and that the results are highly improbable. In comparing the two studies, peace researcher Kristine Eck of Uppsala University notes that the IFHS study which covered the same period as the Lancet survey "was based on a much larger sample (9,345 households compared to Burnham et al's 1,849) in far more clusters (1,086 clusters compared to Burnham et al's 47)." In comparing the two studies, Joachim Kreutz of Stockholm University and Nicholas Marsh of PRIO said the IFHS study produced "a more reliable estimate." Oxford University political scientist Adam Roberts wrote that the IFHS study was "more rigorous."

Burnham, Edward J. Mills, and Frederick M. Burkle noted that the IFHS's data indicated that Iraqi mortality increased by a factor of 1.9 following the invasion, compared to the factor of 2.4 found by Burnham et al., which translates to some 433,000 excess Iraqi deaths (violent and non-violent). Timothy R. Gulden considered it implausible that fewer than one-third of these excess deaths would have been violent in nature. Francisco J. Luquero and Rebecca F. Grais argued that the IFHS's lengthy survey and use of IBC data as a proxy for particularly dangerous areas likely resulted in an underestimate of violent mortality, while Gulden hypothesized that respondents may have been reluctant to report violent deaths to researchers working with the Iraqi government. In a similar vein, Tirman observed that the Iraqi Health Ministry was affiliated with Shi'ite sectarians at the time, remarking that there was evidence that many violent deaths may have been recategorized as "non-violent" to avoid government retribution: "For example, the number of deaths by auto accidents rose by four times the pre-invasion rate; had this single figure been included in the violent deaths category, the overall estimate would have risen to 196,000." Gulden even commented that "the IFHS results are easily in line with the finding of more than 600,000 violent deaths in the study by Burnham et al." However, the authors of the IFHS rejected such claims: "Because the level of underreporting is almost certainly higher for deaths in earlier time periods, we did not attempt to estimate excess deaths. The excess deaths reported by Burnham et al. included only 8.2% of deaths from nonviolent causes, so inclusion of these deaths will not increase the agreement between the estimates from the IFHS and Burnham et al."

A graph in the Lancet article purportedly demonstrating that its conclusions are in line with violence trends measured by the IBC and Defense Department used cherry-picked data and had two Y-axes; the authors conceded that the graph was flawed, but the Lancet never retracted it.

=== Iraq Health Minister estimate (2006) ===
In early November 2006 Iraq's Health Minister Ali al-Shemari said that he estimated between 100,000 and 150,000 people had been killed since the March 2003 U.S.-led invasion. The Taipei Times reported on his methodology: "Al-Shemari said on Thursday [, November 9, 2006,] that he based his figure on an estimate of 100 bodies per day brought to morgues and hospitals – though such a calculation would come out closer to 130,000 in total." The Washington Post reported: "As al-Shemari issued the startling new estimate, the head of the Baghdad central morgue said Thursday he was receiving as many as 60 violent death victims each day at his facility alone. Dr. Abdul-Razzaq al-Obaidi said those deaths did not include victims of violence whose bodies were taken to the city's many hospital morgues or those who were removed from attack scenes by relatives and quickly buried according to Muslim custom."

From a November 9, 2006, International Herald Tribune article:

Each day we lost 100 persons, that means per month 3,000, per year it's 36,000, plus or minus 10 percent", al-Shemari said. "So by three years, 120,000, half-year 20,000, that means 140,000, plus or minus 10 percent", he said, explaining how he came to the figures. "This includes all Iraqis killed – police, ordinary people, children", he said, adding that people who were kidnapped and later found dead were also included in his estimate. He said the figures were compiled by counting bodies brought to "forensic institutes" or hospitals.

From a November 11, 2006, Taipei Times article:

An official with the ministry also confirmed the figure yesterday [November 10, 2006], but later said that the estimated deaths ranged between 100,000 and 150,000. "The minister was misquoted. He said between 100,000–150,000 people were killed in three-and-a-half years", the official said.

=== United Nations (2006) ===
The United Nations reported that 34,452 violent deaths occurred in 2006, based on data from morgues, hospitals, and municipal authorities across Iraq.

=== D3 Systems poll (2007) ===
From February 25 to March 5, 2007, D3 Systems conducted a poll for the BBC, ABC News, ARD and USA Today.

ABC News reported: "One in six says someone in their own household has been harmed. ... 53 percent of Iraqis say a close friend or immediate family member has been hurt in the current violence. That ranges from three in 10 in the Kurdish provinces to, in Baghdad, nearly eight in 10."

The methodology was described thus: "This poll... was conducted February 25 – March 5, 2007, through in-person interviews with a random national sample of 2,212 Iraqi adults, including oversamples in Anbar province, Basra city, Kirkuk and the Sadr City section of Baghdad. The results have a 2.5-point error margin."

There was a field staff of 150 Iraqis in all. That included 103 interviewers, interviewing selected respondents at 458 locales across the country. "This poll asked about nine kinds of violence (car bombs, snipers or crossfire, kidnappings, fighting among opposing groups or abuse of civilians by various armed forces)."

Question 35 asked: "Have you or an immediate family member – by which I mean someone living in this household – been physically harmed by the violence that is occurring in the country at this time?" Here are the results in percentages:

Groups	Yes	No	No opinion
All	17	83	0
Sunni	21	79	0
Shiite	17	83	0
Kurdish	7	93	0

17% of respondents reported that at least one member of the household had been "physically harmed by the violence that is occurring in the country at this time." The survey did not ask whether multiple household members had been harmed.

=== Opinion Research Business (ORB) survey (2007, 2008) ===
A September 14, 2007, estimate by Opinion Research Business (ORB), an independent British polling agency, suggested that the total Iraqi violent death toll due to the Iraq War since the U.S.-led invasion was in excess of 1.2 million (1,220,580). These results were based on a survey of 1,499 adults in Iraq from August 12–19, 2007. ORB published an update in January 2008 based on additional work carried out in rural areas of Iraq. Some 600 additional interviews were undertaken and as a result of this the death estimate was revised to 1,033,000 with a given range of 946,000 to 1,120,000.

Participants of the ORB survey were asked the following question: "How many members of your household, if any, have died as a result of the conflict in Iraq since 2003 (ie as a result of violence rather than a natural death such as old age)? Please note that I mean those who were actually living under your roof."

This ORB estimate has been strongly criticised as exaggerated and ill-founded in peer reviewed literature. According to Carnegie Mellon University historian Jay D. Aronson, "Because this was a number that few people could take seriously (given the incredible magnitude of violence that would have had to take place daily for such a number to be even remotely possible), the ORB study has largely been ignored."

=== Iraq Family Health Survey (IFHS, 2008) ===
The Iraq Family Health Survey published in 2008 in The New England Journal of Medicine surveyed 9,345 households across Iraq and was carried out in 2006 and 2007. It estimated 151,000 deaths due to violence (95% uncertainty range, 104,000 to 223,000) from March 2003 through June 2006.

The study was done by the "Iraq Family Health Survey Study Group", a collaborative effort of six organizations: the Federal Ministry of Health, Baghdad; Kurdistan Ministry of Planning, Erbil; Kurdistan Ministry of Health, Erbil; Central Organization for Statistics and Information Technology, Baghdad; World Health Organization Iraq office, Amman, Jordan; World Health Organization, Geneva.

Rates of violent deaths per 1000 person-years by demographic (IFHS, 2008)
Demographic	# of violent deaths per 1000 person years		
Demographic	Pre-invasion	Post-invasion	Post-invasion (corrected for underreporting)
Children (<15)	0	0.34	0.52
Women (15-59)	0.09	0.09	0.14
Men (15-59)	0.28	3.15	4.82
Elderly (>60)	0	0.57	0.87
All demographics	0.10	1.09	1.67

=== The Associated Press and Health Ministry (2009) ===
In April 2009, the Associated Press reported that Iraq Health Ministry had recorded (via death certificates issued by hospitals and morgues) a total of 87,215 violent deaths of Iraqi citizens between January 1, 2005, and February 28, 2009. The number excludes thousands of missing persons and civilians whose deaths were unrecorded; the government official who provided the data told the AP that if included, the number of dead for that period would be 10 to 20 percent higher.

The Associated Press used the Health Ministry tally and other data (including counts of casualties for 2003–2004, and after March 1, 2009, from hospital sources and media reports, in major part the Iraq Body Count) to estimate that more than 110,600 Iraqis were killed from the start of the war to April 2009. Experts interviewed by the AP found this estimate to be credible and an "important baseline" although necessarily an estimate because of unrecorded deaths, especially in inaccessible areas. While mass graves discovered over time shed more light on deaths in the Iraq War, the AP noted that "how many remain will never be known."

=== PLOS Medicine (2013) ===
A 2013 study by Hagopian et al. in PLOS Medicine estimated that 461,000 Iraqis died as a result of the Iraq War. The study used a similar methodology as the 2006 Lancet study and had the lead author of the 2006 study as one of the 12 authors. According to one of the authors, Amy Hagopian, half of the casualties not resulting from violence were due to inadequate treatment of cardiovascular disease. Upon the study's publication, Michael Spagat, a critic of the 2006 Lancet study, said that the 2013 study seemed "to fix most of the methodological flaws of the 2006 paper". Spagat however noted that he found the large confidence interval of the 2013 study disconcerting. Other critics of the 2006 Lancet study mirrored Spagat's views, noting that the 2013 study was an improvement but that the large confidence interval was concerning.

A 2017 study by Spagat and Van Weezel replicated the 2013 study by Hagopian et al. and found that the 500,000 casualty estimate by Hagopian et al. was not supported by data. Spagat and Van Weezel said that Hagopian et al. made many methodological errors. Hagopian et al. defended their original study, arguing that Van Weezel and Spagat misunderstood their method. Van Weezel and Spagat answered, saying that the response by Hagopian et al. "avoids the central points, addresses only secondary issues and makes ad hominem attacks."

=== Some media estimates ===
In December 2005 President Bush said there were 30,000 Iraqi dead. White House spokesman Scott McClellan later said it was "not an official government estimate", and was based on media reports.

For 2006, a January 2, 2007, Associated Press article reports: "The tabulation by the Iraqi ministries of Health, Defence and Interior, showed that 14,298 civilians, 1,348 police and 627 soldiers had been killed in the violence that raged across the country last year. The Associated Press figure, gleaned from daily news reports from Baghdad, arrived at a total of 13,738 deaths." The Australian reports in a January 2, 2007, article: "A figure of 3700 civilian deaths in October '[2006]', the latest tally given by the UN based on data from the Health Ministry and the Baghdad morgue, was branded exaggerated by the Iraqi Government." Iraqi government estimates include "people killed in bombings and shootings but not deaths classed as 'criminal'." Also, they "include no deaths among the many civilians wounded in attacks who may die later from wounds. Nor do they include many people kidnapped whose fate remains unknown."

A June 25, 2006, Los Angeles Times article, "War's Iraqi Death Toll Tops 50,000", reported that their estimate of violent deaths consisted "mostly of civilians" but probably also included security forces and insurgents. It added that, "Many more Iraqis are believed to have been killed but not counted because of serious lapses in recording deaths in the chaotic first year after the invasion, when there was no functioning Iraqi government, and continued spotty reporting nationwide since." Here is how the Times got its number: "The Baghdad morgue received 30,204 bodies from 2003 through mid-2006, while the Health Ministry said it had documented 18,933 deaths from 'military clashes' and 'terrorist attacks' from April 5, 2004, to June 1, 2006. Together, the toll reaches 49,137. However, samples obtained from local health departments in other provinces show an undercount that brings the total well beyond 50,000. The figure also does not include deaths outside Baghdad in the first year of the invasion."

=== Reviews ===
A 2008 review of Iraqi death estimates concluded that 600,000 deaths between 2003 and 2006 likely undercounted total mortality:

Studies assessed as the highest quality, those using population-based methods, yielded the highest estimates... Our review indicates that, despite varying estimates, the mortality burden of the war and its sequelae on Iraq is large... Of the population-based studies, the Roberts and Burnham studies provided the most rigorous methodology as their primary outcome was mortality... not surprisingly their studies have been roundly criticized given the political consequences of their findings and the inherent security and political problems of conducting this type of research.

A 2016 review came to similar conclusions, stating that estimates of very high Iraqi casualties published in the journal Lancet are

"...widely viewed among peers as the most rigorous investigations of Iraq War–related mortality among Iraqi civilians; we agree with this assessment and believe that the [PLOS] study is also scientifically rigorous... [Iraqi civilian deaths] in fact, may have been underestimated by these scientifically conservative studies."

According to a 2017 review by Keith Krause of the Graduate Institute of International and Development Studies, Geneva, Switzerland, "the consensus seems to be that around 150,000 people died violently as a result of the fighting between 2003 and 2006."

== Undercounting ==
Some studies estimating the casualties due to the war in Iraq say there are various reasons why the estimates and counts may be low.

Morgue workers have alleged that official numbers underestimate the death toll. The bodies of some casualties do not end up in morgue and thus may go unrecorded. In 2006, The Washington Post reported: "Police and hospitals often give widely conflicting figures of those killed in major bombings. In addition, death figures are reported through multiple channels by government agencies that function with varying efficiency."

A January 31, 2008 Perspective in the New England Journal of Medicine contains the following discussion of undercounting Iraqi civilian casualties in household surveys:

... sometimes it was problematic or too dangerous to enter a cluster of households, which might well result in an undercount; data from the Iraq Body Count on the distribution of deaths among provinces were used to calculate estimates in these instances. If the clustering of violent deaths wasn't accurately captured, that could also increase uncertainty. The sampling frame was based on a 2004 count, but the population has been changing rapidly and dramatically because of sectarian violence, the flight of refugees, and overall population migration. Another source of bias in household surveys is underreporting due to the dissolution of some households after a death, so that no one remains to tell the former inhabitants' story.

The Washington Post noted in 2008 that

research has shown that household surveys typically miss 30 to 50 percent of deaths. One reason is that some families that have suffered violent deaths leave the survey area. ... Some people are kidnapped and disappear, and others turn up months or years later in mass graves. Some are buried or otherwise disposed of without being recorded. In particularly violent areas, local governments have effectively ceased to function, and there are ineffective channels for collecting and passing information between hospitals, morgues and the central government.

The October 2006 Lancet study states:

Aside from Bosnia, we can find no conflict situation where passive surveillance [used by the IBC] recorded more than 20% of the deaths measured by population-based methods [used in the Lancet studies]. In several outbreaks, disease and death recorded by facility-based methods underestimated events by a factor of ten or more when compared with population-based estimates. Between 1960 and 1990, newspaper accounts of political deaths in Guatemala correctly reported over 50% of deaths in years of low violence but less than 5% in years of highest violence.

The report describes no other specific examples except for this study of Guatemala.

Juan Cole wrote in October 2006 that even though heavy fighting could be observed, none of the Iraqi casualties in the skirmishes were reported on, which suggests undercounting.

A July 28, 2004, opinion piece by Robert Fisk published by The Independent reports that "some families bury their dead without notifying the authorities."

Stephen Soldz, who runs the website "Iraq Occupation and Resistance Report", wrote in a February 5, 2006, article:

Of course, in conditions of active rebellion, the safer areas accessible to Western reporters are likely to be those under US/Coalition control, where deaths are, in turn, likely to be due to insurgent attacks. Areas of insurgent control, which are likely to be subject to US and Iraqi government attack, for example most of Anbar province, are simply off-limits to these reporters. Thus, the realities of reporting imply that reporters will be witness to a larger fraction of deaths due to insurgents and a lesser proportion of deaths due to US and Iraqi government forces.

An October 19, 2006, The Washington Post article reports:

The deaths reported by officials and published in the news media represent only a fraction of the thousands of mutilated bodies winding up in Baghdad's overcrowded morgue each month. ... Bodies are increasingly being dumped in and around Baghdad in fields staked out by individual Shiite militias and Sunni insurgent groups. Iraqi security forces often refuse to go to the dumping grounds, leaving the precise number of bodies in those sites unknown. Civilian deaths, unlike those of American troops, often go unrecorded.

The Australian reported in January 2007 that Iraqi government casualty estimates do not count deaths classed as 'criminal', deaths of civilians who get wounded and die later from the wounds, or kidnap victims who have not been found.

The Iraq Body Count project (IBC) stated in November 2004 that "we have always been quite explicit that our own total is certain to be an underestimate of the true position, because of gaps in reporting or recording".

=== Underreporting by U.S. authorities ===
An April 2005 article by The Independent reports:

A week before she was killed by a suicide bomber, humanitarian worker Marla Ruzicka forced military commanders to admit they did keep records of Iraqi civilians killed by US forces. ... in an essay Ms Ruzicka wrote a week before her death on Saturday and published yesterday, the 28-year-old revealed that a Brigadier General told her it was "standard operating procedure" for US troops to file a report when they shoot a non-combatant. She obtained figures for the number of civilians killed in Baghdad between February 28 and April 5 [2005], and discovered that 29 had been killed in firefights involving US forces and insurgents. This was four times the number of Iraqi police killed.

The December 2006 report of the Iraq Study Group (ISG) found that the United States has filtered out reports of violence in order to disguise its perceived policy failings in Iraq. A December 7, 2006, McClatchy Newspapers article reports that the ISG found that U.S. officials reported 93 attacks or significant acts of violence on one day in July 2006, yet "a careful review of the reports for that single day brought to light more than 1,100 acts of violence." The article further reports:

The finding confirmed a September 8 McClatchy Newspapers report that U.S. officials excluded scores of people killed in car bombings and mortar attacks from tabulations measuring the results of a drive to reduce violence in Baghdad. By excluding that data, U.S. officials were able to boast that deaths from sectarian violence in the Iraqi capital had declined by more than 52 percent between July and August, McClatchy newspapers reported.

From the ISG report itself:

A murder of an Iraqi is not necessarily counted as an attack. If we cannot determine the source of a sectarian attack, that assault does not make it into the database. A roadside bomb or a rocket or mortar attack that doesn't hurt U.S. personnel doesn't count.

=== Casualties caused by criminal and political violence ===
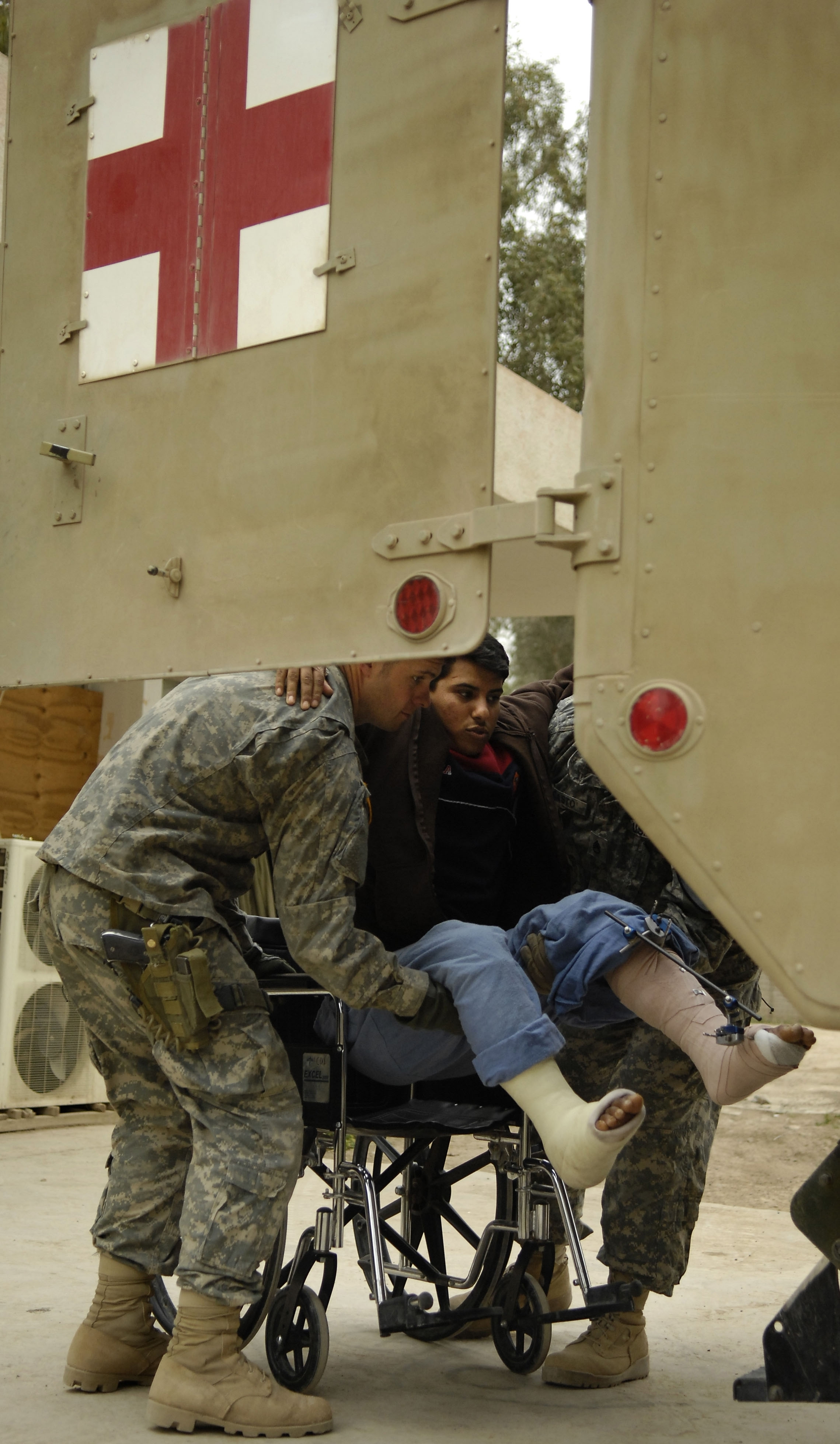
U.S. Army medics lift a wounded Iraqi police officer into an ambulance (March 2007)

In May 2004, Associated Press completed a survey of the morgues in Baghdad and surrounding provinces. The survey tallied violent deaths from May 1, 2003, when President Bush declared an end to major combat operations, through April 30, 2004.

From the AP article:

In Baghdad, a city of about 5.6 million, 4,279 people were recorded killed in the 12 months through April 30, [2004], according to figures provided by Kais Hassan, director of statistics at Baghdad's Medicolegal Institute, which administers the city's morgues. "Before the war, there was a strong government, strong security. There were a lot of police on the streets and there were no illegal weapons", he said during an AP reporter's visit to the morgue. "Now there are few controls. There is crime, revenge killings, so much violence." The figure does not include most people killed in big terrorist bombings, Hassan said. The cause of death in such cases is obvious so bodies are usually not taken to the morgue, but given directly to victims' families. Also, the bodies of killed fighters from groups like the al-Mahdi Army are rarely taken to morgues.

Accidental trauma deaths from car accidents, falls, etc. are not included in the numbers. The article reports that the numbers translate to 76 killings per 100,000 people in Baghdad, compared to 39 in Bogotá, Colombia, 7.5 in New York City, and 2.4 in neighboring Jordan. The article states that there were 3.0 killings per 100,000 people in Baghdad in 2002 (the year before the war). Morgues surveyed in other parts of Iraq also reported large increases in the number of homicides. Karbala, south of Baghdad, increased from an average of one homicide per month in 2002 to an average of 55 per month in the year following the invasion; in Tikrit, north of Baghdad, where there were no homicides in 2002, the rate had grown to an average of 17 per month; in the northern province of Kirkuk, the rate had increased from 3 per month in 2002 to 34 per month in the survey period.

== See also ==
- Casualty recording
- Center for Civilians in Conflict
- Civilian casualty ratio
- Health in Iraq
- International Criminal Court and the 2003 invasion of Iraq
- Iraq Body Count project
- Iraq Family Health Survey
- Lancet surveys of Iraq War casualties
- List of aviation shootdowns and accidents during the Iraq War
- ORB survey of Iraq War casualties
- Post-traumatic stress disorder
- United States military casualties of war
- Violence against academics in post-invasion Iraq
