= Look for Your Own =

Internet project by the Ministry of Internal Affairs of Ukraine

- Available in: Russian
- Country of origin: Ukraine
- Owner: Ministry of Internal Affairs (Ukraine)
- Website: https://t.me/rf200_nooow
- Launched: February 2022

Look for Your Own (Russian: Ищи своих, Ishchi Svoikh) is an Internet project created on the initiative of the Ministry of Internal Affairs of Ukraine to identify captured or killed soldiers of the Russian army during the Russian invasion of Ukraine in 2022. It was launched with the website domain name 200rf.com and currently operates as a Telegram channel.

== Project ==
According to the creators, the project is designed to allow Russian citizens to find their relatives who were sent to the war in Ukraine by the Russian government and learn about their fate. The project was incentivized by the fact that Russia's Ministry of Defense has given no details of any military losses at first and has omitted the actual number of dead and captured Russian soldiers on the territory of Ukraine later. Russia has also been ignoring Ukraine's requests for a mission to transfer the corpses to Russia. It is also believed that the site aims to undermine the morale and support for the war in Russia.

The name of the site references the military code Cargo-200 that was used by the Soviet military for corpses being flown back from the war in Afghanistan in the 1980s. The term can also be read as a reference to the horror film under the same title.

"Look for Your Own" is posted on the official website, as well as in the Telegram channel. As of 3 March, the channel had 700,000 subscribers, 90 percent of them from Russia. The coordinator of the project is Viktor Andrusiv, adviser to the Minister of Internal Affairs. The project is led by journalists Volodymyr Zolkin and Dmytro Karpenko.

== History ==
On 24 February 2022, the Russian Federation carried out a full-scale invasion of Ukraine as part of the Russian-Ukrainian war. As of 13 March, more than 12,000 Russian servicemen were reported by the General Staff of the Ukrainian Armed Forces to have been killed, and more than 700 to be held captive.

On 27 February, the Ministry of Internal Affairs of Ukraine announced the creation of a special Internet project aimed at helping relatives and friends of the dead or prisoners to find or identify them. The project coordinator is Viktor Andrusiv, an advisor to the Minister of the Interior. The site publishes videos, photos, and documents of prisoners and killed. The authenticity of at least two videos was confirmed by Radio Svoboda journalists. As well, Ukraine has opened a hotline for families of Russian soldiers who were likely captured as POWs, under the title Come back alive from Ukraine! Vadym Denysenko, advisor to Ukraine's Minister of Internal Affairs, assured that Ukraine treats prisoners humanely and the Interior Ministry is ready to provide a paid service for Russian citizens for DNA identification of the bodies.

At the request of Roskomnadzor, the "Look for Your Own" website was blocked in Russia, and a request was sent to the Telegram service to remove the channel.

People's Deputy Yevhenia Kravchuk stated that for the first day of work the service received more than 2,000 appeals. As of 2 March, relatives identified 60 captured soldiers.

The Washington Post described the project as "a gruesome tactic in hopes of stoking anti-government rage inside Russia". It said the project could be interpreted as violating the provisions of the Geneva Conventions which state that governments must "protect prisoners of war from insults and public curiosity". In an article published by the Wilson Center, the project's manager, Viktor Andrusiv, responded that the project was performing an "exclusively humanitarian function".

The Ministry of Defense of the Russian Federation does not comment on the data published by the Internet project, but any access to the site is blocked in Russia based on a decision of the Prosecutor General's Office of the Russian Federation.

== In culture ==
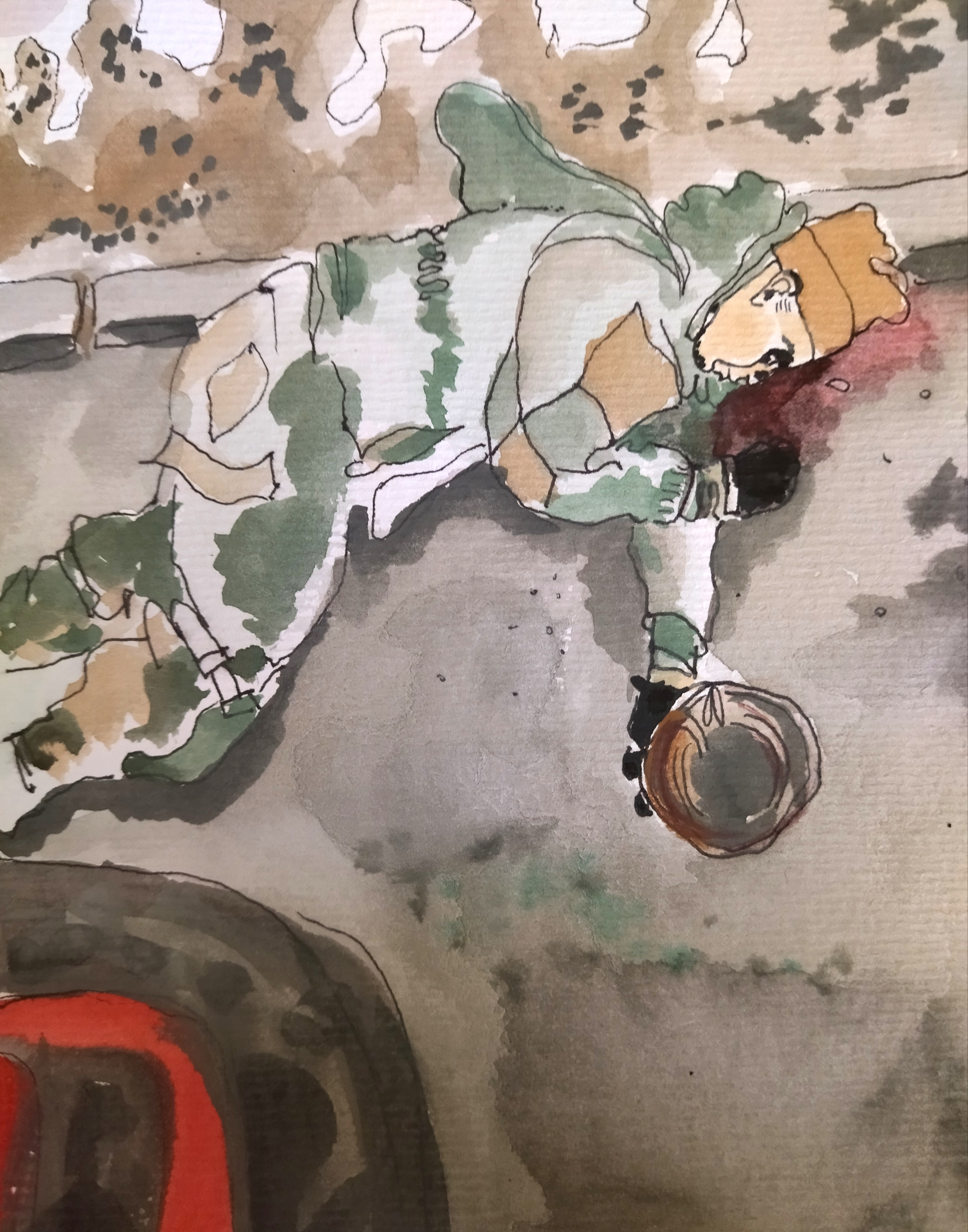
Watercolor based on photo from the Look for Your Own channel, by Chana Anushik Manhaimer

On 2 May 2022, the visual arts magazine Tohu published an article by artist Chana Anushik Manhaimer called "Ищи Своих / Look for Your Own". In this visual essay, the artist exhibited numerous watercolor paintings based on hard-to-watch images from the "Look for Your Own" channel, accompanied by a text. It was published in English, Arabic and Hebrew.

== See also ==
- Volodymyr Zolkin
- I Want to Live (hotline)
