= Volodymyr Zolkin =

Ukrainian YouTuber and activist (born 1981)

- Володимир Золькін
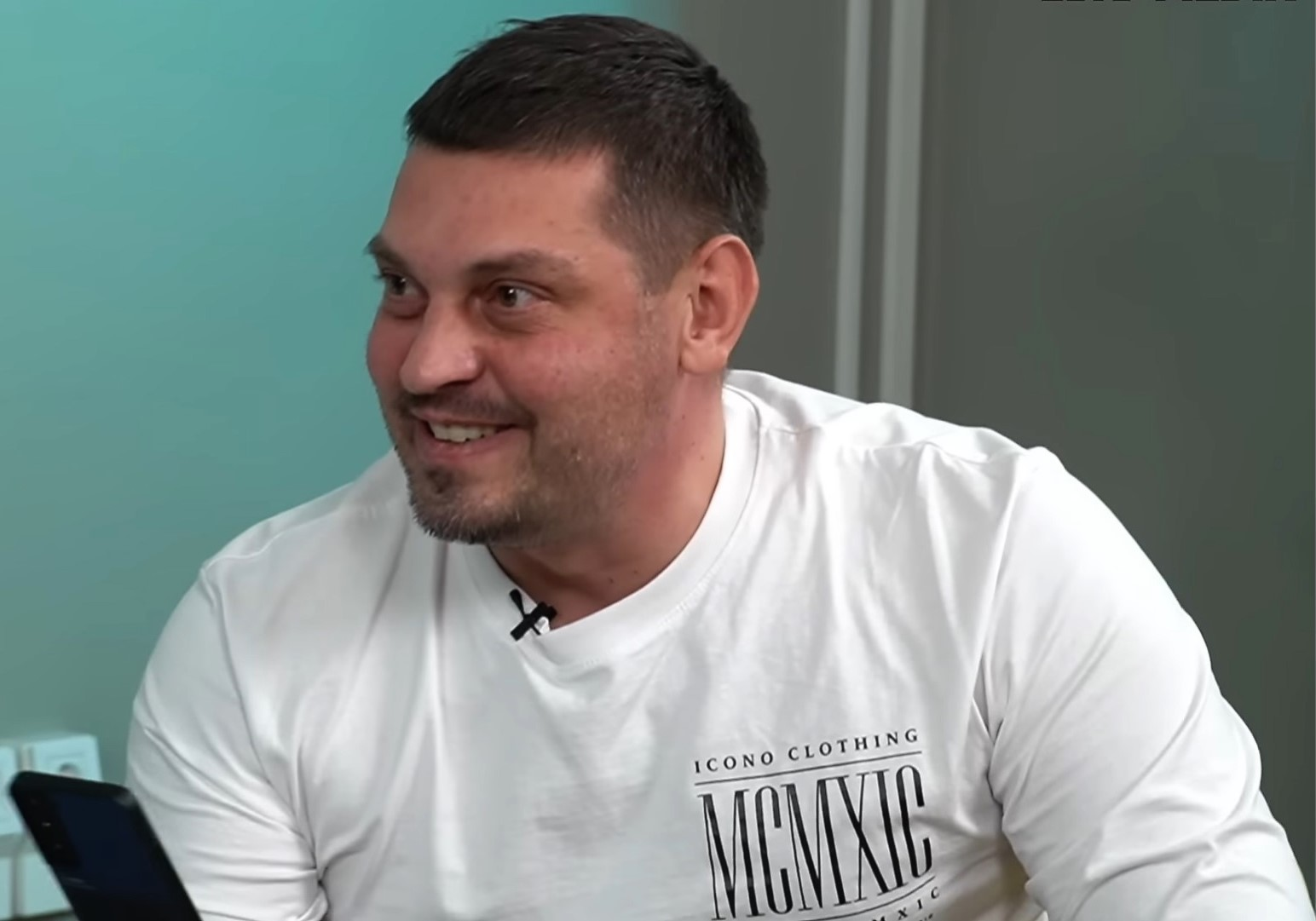
- Zolkin in 2022
- Born: 1981 (age 44–45); Kiev, Ukrainian SSR, Soviet Union (now Ukraine)
- Occupations: Journalist; freelance videographer
- Years active: 2022–present (YouTube)
- Website: www.youtube.com/c/volodymyrzolkin

Volodymyr Oleksandrovych Zolkin (Ukrainian: Володимир Олександрович Золкін; born 1981) is a Ukrainian journalist, YouTuber and activist, living in Kyiv. He rose to prominence in 2022 after the 2022 Russian invasion of Ukraine, by interviewing prisoners of war for his YouTube channel, beginning 18 March 2022.

"Russian prisoners are asked to confirm that they have agreed to the interview and its broadcast, before being asked to give an account of their military background and the events that led to their capture, along with their thoughts on the war." [. . .] "The prisoners are allowed to call family and friends at home.. The reasoning is that the mothers of captured soldiers would truly listen to what their sons were saying about the truth about the war, Zolkin said."

Zolkin also independently telephones Russians with news about their relatives in the army deployed in Ukraine, and tries to counter disinformation about the war from the Russian state. He has access to a family's contact details from Look for Your Own, a service which allows Russians to leave their details and those of missing soldiers they are looking for. Zolkin matches requests with photographs and videos from the front line.

Zolkin's videos have been widely referenced, and praised, across western media, although lawyers have suggested that he is violating the Third Geneva Convention by parading prisoners of war on the Internet. Zolkin denies this.
