= ICasualties.org =

Website tracking Afghanistan and Iraq War casualties

iCasualties.org

- Screenshot dated August 28, 2010.
- Website type: Nonprofit / user-supported
- Available in: English
- Creator: Michael White
- Website: http://icasualties.org
- Commercial: No
- Launched: May 2003
- Current status: Active

iCasualties.org, formally the Iraq Coalition Casualty Count, is an independent website created in May 2003 by Michael White, a software engineer from Stone Mountain, Georgia, to track casualties in the War in Afghanistan, Iraq War, and Iran War.

The website compiles information on casualties incurred by the Multi-National Force (MNF) in Iraq and the International Security Assistance Force in Afghanistan. The data is gathered from news reports and press releases from the U.S. Department of Defense, CENTCOM, the MNF, and the British Ministry of Defence. Since its inception, the project has grown in scope, and now also provides fatality counts for contractors, Iraqi security forces (since January 2005), and Iraqi civilians (since March 2005).

The website is considered an "authoritative" record of MNF casualties in Iraq and has been cited by several reputable sources, including the BBC, the Associated Press, Voice of America, The New York Times, and The Washington Post.

However, his number differs considerably from other counts regarding the Afghanistan War because many assume his count for Operation Enduring Freedom refers solely to "the war in Afghanistan." In fact, he includes deaths from all theaters of combat associated with Operation Enduring Freedom, including Cuba, the Philippines and the Horn of Africa. White told The Takeaway that "Our count of U.S. fatalities in Operation Enduring Freedom has surpassed 1,000; however, U.S. fatalities specifically in and around Afghanistan remain under this benchmark."

White has stated that it costs him $500 per month to maintain the website, and he will continue to maintain it as long as he can raise the necessary money to cover the costs.

== See also ==
- Casualties of the conflict in Iraq since 2003
- Coalition casualties in Afghanistan
- Iraq Body Count project
- Lancet surveys of casualties of the Iraq War
- Russia 200
