= Casualty recording =

Recording deaths from conflict or violence

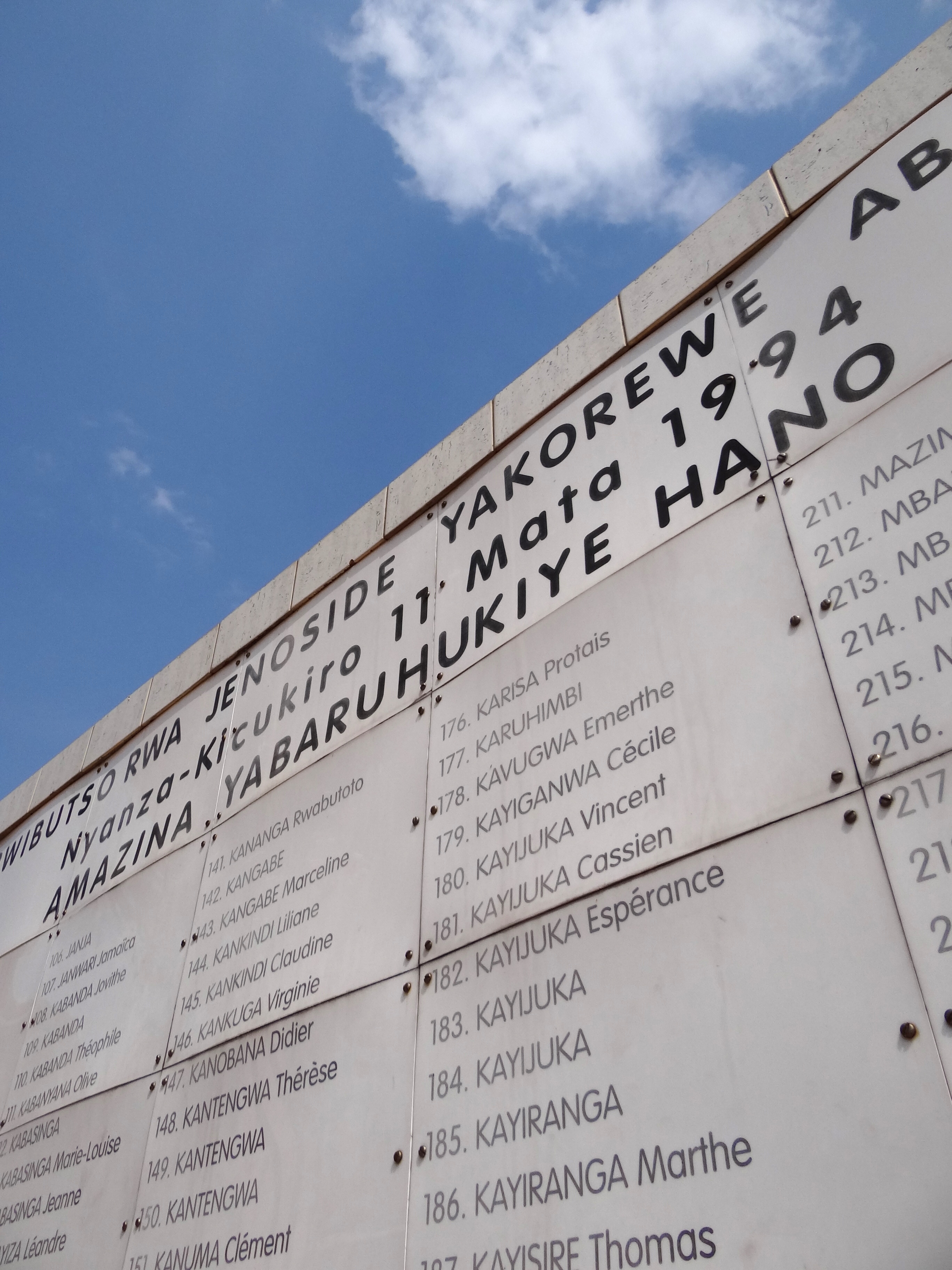
Nyanza Genocide Memorial Site, monument listing names of Rwandan genocide victims

Casualty recording is the systematic and continuous process of documenting individual direct deaths from armed conflict or widespread violence. It aims to create a comprehensive account of all deaths within a determined scope, usually bound by time and location.

== Parameters ==
At minimum, casualty recording typically involves documenting the date and location of a violent incident; the number of people killed; the means of violence or category of weapon used; and the party responsible. Casualty recording differs from casualty tracking by military actors to track the effects of their operations on the civilian population for the purpose of improving their procedures and reducing civilian casualties.

A defining feature of casualty recording is that it is victim-centric and seeks to establish the identity of every fatality including name, age, sex, and other relevant demographic details. Where relevant to the conflict context, this may also include ethnicity and religious or political affiliation. However, depending on the aims and resources of the organisation conducting the recording, a particular initiative may record only a specific subset of deaths. Subsets may include, for example, deaths caused by a specific belligerent or weapons type, or deaths of a particular segment of the population, such as children.

Casualty recording focuses on documenting direct deaths from armed violence. It does not normally include deaths caused by the indirect or reverberating effects of conflict. Some casualty recording initiatives document injuries as well as deaths. Casualty records may overlap with, or operate in conjunction with, records of persons who have gone missing during a conflict or period of violence.

== Aims and uses ==
Practitioners have different aims and motivations for conducting casualty recording. Typically these are grounded in considerations relating to international humanitarian law or human rights law. Casualty records have also been used to support some humanitarian disarmament initiatives.

The purported aims of casualty records include:

- Recognising the dignity and rights of victims and their families, including the right to life and the right to the truth. This work often overlaps with efforts to trace missing people in situations of armed conflict.
- Supporting accountability and peace building processes including memorialisation, transitional justice and criminal prosecutions for war crimes or crimes against humanity. These activities can play an important role in reducing cycles of violence and promoting community reconciliation.
- Supporting the protection of civilians by providing information to reduce unintended consequences of military activities and improve humanitarian response planning.
- Informing media reporting and policy makers on conflict dynamics.
- Informing, monitoring and improving protection measures aimed at specific populations affected by armed violence including children, women, persons with disabilities, journalists, health workers and older persons.
- Enabling victims' families to receive reparation, compensation and access to services, as well as inheritance rights.
- Identifying the unintended and unacceptable harm to civilians caused by the use of certain weapons. Casualty data on anti-personnel landmines and cluster munitions helped drive international efforts to ban these weapons, and information on the effects of explosive weapons in populated areas is informing efforts to curb their use.

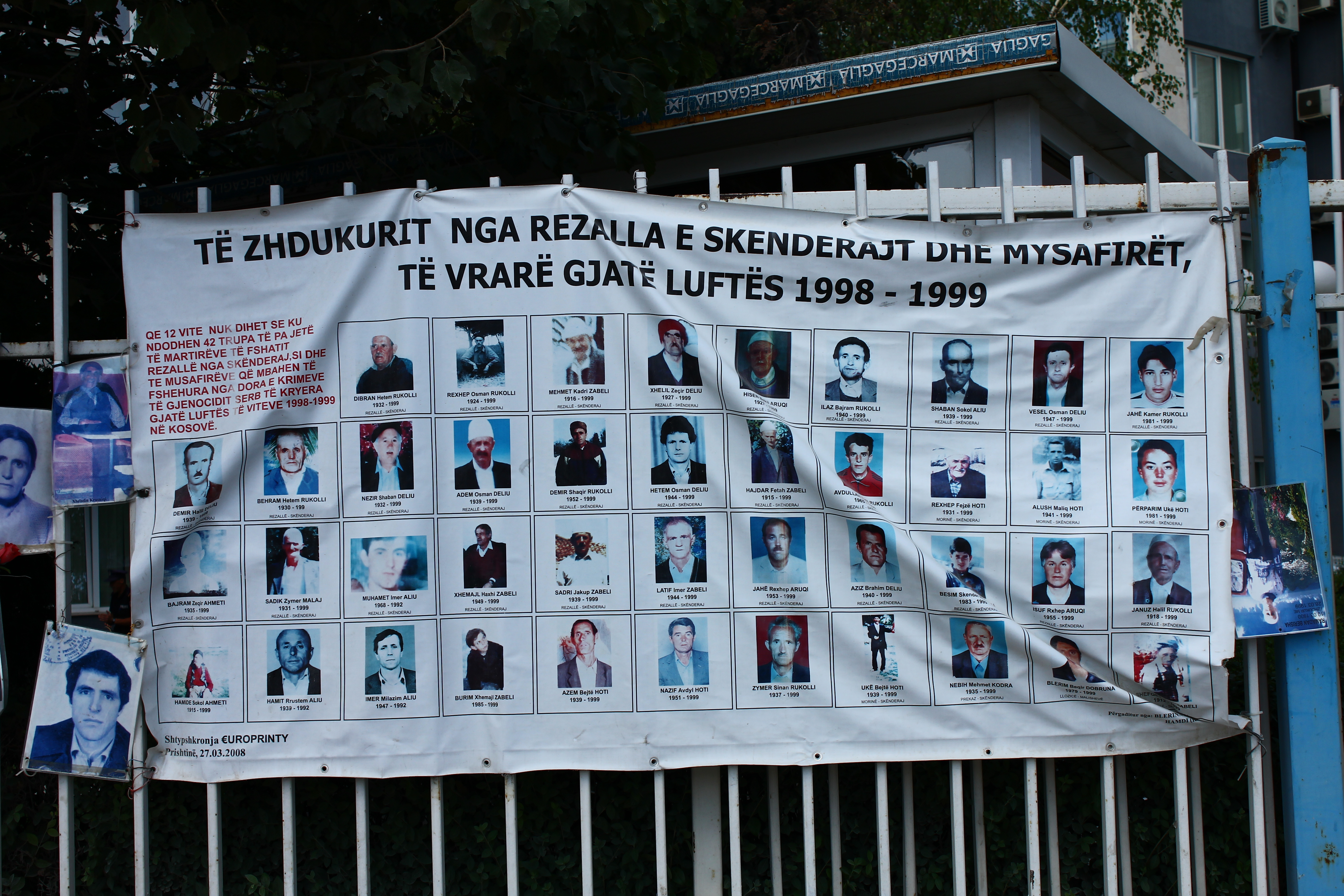
Memorial of victims of Kosovo war

== History ==
The twenty-first century practice of monitoring and publishing detailed online information on the human casualties of armed conflicts is sometimes associated with the Iraq Body Count project that started monitoring Iraqi deaths in the 2003 invasion of Iraq. The Iraq Body Count estimates, the 2004 and 2006 Lancet surveys of Iraq War casualties and the ORB survey of Iraq War casualties led to several years of academic debate over the accuracy of the various surveys of the total casualties of the Iraq War.

== Methods and standards ==
Approaches to casualty recording vary depending on the context, purpose and resources of the organisation responsible. In 2016, Standards for Casualty Recording were published by the UK-based NGO Every Casualty Counts, in an effort to harmonise approaches across the field and promote best practice.

The data gathered by a casualty recording project will generally be stored in an electronic or paper-based database, but there is no standard format for sharing or publishing the final results. Some casualty recorders, such as Iraq Body Count project and Yemen Data Project, make their records publicly available online and searchable. Casualty recorders have also published books of their records, such as the Kosovo Memory Book and Lost Lives (relating to deaths from the conflict in Northern Ireland). Lost Lives was subsequently reproduced as a documentary film in 2019. Casualty data may also be used to produce digital or physical memorials of those who died, as in the case of Remembering The Ones We Lost, which memorialises individuals who were killed or went missing during the conflict in South Sudan.

== Practitioners ==
Casualty recording is frequently conducted by civil society organisations in the absence of official recording processes led by state entities. In some armed conflict situations, public services normally involved in recording deaths (including hospitals and other health services, as well as coroners and police forces) are no longer functioning effectively. There may also be political reasons why state authorities do not publish or share information on conflict related deaths. Some internationally mandated entities, including UN peacekeeping missions or commissions of inquiry, conduct casualty recording as part of their broader work.

Examples of organisations which conduct, or have conducted, casualty recording include:

- Action on Armed Violence, UK
- Airwars
- Al Mezan Center for Human Rights
- B'Tselem for Israel and the Israeli-occupied territories
- The Bureau of Investigative Journalism
- Centre for Border Studies - Jindal School of International Affairs, India
- Colombian Campaign Against Landmines (Colombia Sin Minas)
- Conflict Archive on the Internet (CAIN), Northern Ireland
- Conflict Analysis Resource Centre, Colombia
- Crisis Tracker
- Forensic Anthropology Foundation of Guatemala
- Humanitarian Law Centre, Kosovo
- Humanitarian Law Centre, Serbia
- Humanitarian Outcomes – Aid Worker Security Database
- The Human Rights Center Georgia
- Iniskoy for Peace and Democracy Organisation, Somalia
- INSEC in Nepal
- International Commission on Missing Persons
- Iraq Body Count project, ORB survey of Iraq War casualties, Lancet surveys of Iraq War casualties
- Landmine and Cluster Munition Monitor
- Lost Lives, Northern Ireland
- Nigeria Watch
- Omeria Organisation
- Pakistan Body Count
- Pakistan Institute for Peace Studies
- Palestinian Centre for Human Rights
- Somali Human Rights Association (SOHRA)
- Surveillance System for Attacks on Healthcare (SSA), World Health Organisation
- Syria Justice and Accountability
- Syrian Centre for Statistics and Research
- Syrian Network for Human Rights
- Tghat Victim List for the Tigray War that started in November 2020
- United Nations Commission of Inquiry on the 2018 protests in the Occupied Palestinian Territory
- United Nations Assistance Mission in Afghanistan
- United Nations Assistance Mission for Iraq
- Violations Documentation Center in Syria
- Yemen Data Project

== Non-conflict casualty recording ==
Although casualty recording typically relates to deaths resulting from armed conflict, specialised casualty recording projects not directly related to armed violence also exist. These include projects focused on recording deaths from gender based violence and deaths or disappearances of migrants, homeless people and other vulnerable groups. Examples of such initiatives include:

- Committee to Protect Journalists, recording deaths of journalists worldwide
- Dying Homeless, recording deaths of homeless people in the UK, by the Bureau of Investigative Journalism
- Gun Violence Archive, recording all gun violence incidents, including deaths, in the USA.
- Missing Migrants, tracking deaths along international migratory routes, by the International Organisation of Migration
- Los feminicidios en México, recording deaths from gender based violence in Mexico

== See also ==
- Rudolph Rummel
