= Ammar al-Saffar =

Deputy Health Minister of Iraq, born 1956, abducted 2006

- Born: 1956; Iraq
- Died: after November 19, 2006
- Occupation: Deputy Health Minister
- Employer: Government of Iraq
- Known for: Forced disappearance and likely murder

Ammar al-Saffar (born 1956) was the Deputy Health Minister of Iraq from 2003 until his kidnapping and likely death in 2006. On November 19, 2006, he became the highest-ranking Iraqi official to be kidnapped when he was seized by men in police uniforms.

== Career ==
Since 2003, al-Saffa, a Shiite and member of the Islamic Dawa Party worked as the Deputy Health Minister of Iraq, serving under Prime Minister Nouri al-Maliki and was noted for his open criticism of former President Saddam Hussein. In 2004, he spoke to Al Jazeera about medicine that had been looted from the Ministry of Health, and about quality control weaknesses under the previous Hussein administration.

His son, writing in Foreign Policy in 2010, reported that al-Saffa was on the brink of exposing evidence of Hussein and fellow deputy minister Hakim al-Zamili diverting funds for health towards armed militias.

=== Assassination attempts and abduction ===
There was an attempts on al-Saffa's life in June 2004. On November 19, 2006, al-Saffa was abducted from his Baghdad home, at gun point, by men in Iraqi army uniforms. He was aged 50 at the time of the abduction.

In February 2007, Hakim al-Zamili, and General Hamid al-Shammari, were both arrested on suspicion they had played a role in al-Saffa's and other kidnappings. However, the charges were dropped in March 2008. As of 2008, Saffar remains missing. Saffar's son Ali said a tape was sent to his family showing a hooded figure, ostensibly al-Saffa, being shot, but no body has ever been recovered. Al-Saffar was later declared legally dead in the United Kingdom, where his wife lives.

== Personal life ==
Al-Saffar spent 16 years living in exile in the United Kingdom until he returned to his home country following the 2003 invasion of Iraq.

His son, Ali, lives in London, England.

By 2013 al-Saffa's family considered him deceased and reported feeling no closure.

== See also ==
- Ali al-Shemari
