= Tghat =

Tigrayan news website

tghat.com
- Website type: News
- Available in: English
- Area served: Ethiopia
- Website: tghat.com
- Launched: November 2020; 5 years ago

Tghat is a Tigray news site known for reporting on the Tigray War.

== Creation and editorial line ==
Tghat describes its creation during the Tigray War as motivated by communication blocks and the lack of reporting on "Tigrayan collective national sentiment, and the atrocities committed upon Tigrayans".

== Editorship ==
France 24 describes the Tghat editorial group as "Tigrayan activists living abroad". Meron Gebreananaye describes herself as a United Kingdom-based PhD student and one of the Tghat editors. Gebrekirstos Gebreselassie Gebremeskel (aka Gebrekirstos G. Gebremeskel) states that he is an Amsterdam-based researcher who manages Tghat, and is described by Al Jazeera English as a researcher and manager of Tghat. The editorial group includes several university-based researchers.

== Coverage ==
As of 2022, Tghat reporting is focussed on the Tigray War. Tghat describes its role as "documenting civilian casualties, the destruction of civilian infrastructure, hate campaigns, and providing perspectives and analyses on the war on Tigray".

Tghat's report on the Debre Abbay massacre on 12 January 2021 and its publication of video footage of the massacre in early February were followed by The Daily Telegraph on 19 February 2021 and by France 24 on 10 March 2021.

== Casualty recording ==
According to Associated Press (AP), Tghat's victim list is compiled by Desta Haileselassie Hagos, a Tigrayan living in Stockholm. AP randomly selected 30 of the named victims and judged the information to be authentic after contacting the victims' families and friends.
