= Ali al-Shemari =

Iraqi politician

Minister of Health
- In office May 20, 2006 – April 16, 2007
- Deputy: Hakim al-Zamili
- Preceded by: Abdel Muttalib Mohammed Ali
- Succeeded by: Salih al-Hasnawi

Personal details
- Party: National Shiite Movement

Ali al-Shemari is an Iraqi politician from the Sadrist Movement who was the Health Minister of Iraq from May 20, 2006 until April 16, 2007.

Al-Shemari's deputy, Hakim al-Zamili, and his security chief, Hamid al-Shammari, were arrested and tried in 2007 on claims they ran a death squad that attacked Sunni Arabs patients and visitors in Health Ministry hospitals. Among their supposed victims was Ammar al-Saffar, another deputy health minister who was preparing to expose corruption in the ministry, kidnapped in November 2006. Both men were cleared of all charges when key witnesses failed to show up after facing alleged intimidation.

Following the arrest of his deputies, Shemari fled Iraq.

Political offices
| Preceded by Abdel Muttalib Mohammed Ali | Health Minister of Iraq; May 20, 2006 - April 16, 2007 | Succeeded by Salih al-Hasnawi |

== See also ==
- Council of Ministers of Iraq
- Iraqi Health Ministry casualty survey
- Casualties of the Iraq War
- Iraq War
