= Les Roberts (epidemiologist) =

American epidemiologist

Les Roberts (born 1961) is an American epidemiologist. He was the first winner of the Centers for Disease Control and Prevention's Paul C. Schnitker Award for contributions to global health. He became prominent in the news just before the 2004 U.S. presidential election for his study estimating that 100,000 Iraqi civilians had been killed in the Iraq war at a time when official U.S. government counts were much lower. When a 2006 follow-up study had findings consistent with the earlier report, U.S. President George W. Bush dismissed it, saying the approach had been "pretty well discredited", without explaining how.

== Career ==
Roberts grew up in Onondaga, New York and graduated from Westhill Senior High School in 1979. He obtained an undergraduate degree in physics at St. Lawrence University in 1983 and a master's degree in public health from Tulane University in 1986. He did post-graduate fellowship work with the Centers for Disease Control in Atlanta and obtained a Ph.D. in environmental engineering from Johns Hopkins University in 1992; he has been a regular lecturer there ever since. He is now an Associate Clinical Professor of Population and Family Health at Columbia University's Mailman School of Public Health.

Roberts' first important contribution came from a study among refugees in Malawi conducted for the United Nations regarding the effects of narrow-necked water containers that showed most water contamination came from the hands of refugees. Since that study, narrow-necked water containers have become a standard component of humanitarian relief programs.

Roberts was Director of Health Policy at the International Rescue Committee. In 1994 he worked in Rwanda for the World Health Organization, and performed a similar study to estimate the number of Rwandan refugees. In 2000, he performed a similar study which estimated 1.7 million deaths due to the war in the Democratic Republic of Congo. This study was cited in a U.N. Security Council resolution that all foreign armies must leave Congo, a United Nations request for $140 million in aid, and a pledge by the US State Department for an additional $10 million in aid.

=== Surveys of Iraqi Casualties ===
==== 2004 Study ====
In 2004 Roberts was the lead investigator in the field and lead author of a study, co-authored with four others, titled "Mortality before and after the 2003 invasion of Iraq: cluster sample survey," published in The Lancet. In the study, he estimated that 100,000 Iraqi civilians had been killed in the Iraq war at a time when official U.S. government estimates were much lower.

In opposition to the study's claims, an official Ministerial Statement from the United Kingdom Parliament stated that "the Government do not accept its[The Lancet study's] central conclusion", noting that the Iraq Ministry of Health figures, which were collected from daily hospital reports, showed 3,853 civilian deaths and 15,517 injuries between April 5, 2004 and October 5, 2004.

==== 2006 Study ====
In October 2006 Roberts instigated a second study, Mortality after the 2003 invasion of Iraq: a cross-sectional cluster sample survey, using similar methods and increasing the number of households surveyed. The study was also published in The Lancet, and reported:

"We estimate that between March 18, 2003, and June, 2006, an additional 654,965 (392,979–942,636) Iraqis have died above what would have been expected on the basis of the pre-invasion crude mortality rate as a consequence of the coalition invasion. Of these deaths, we estimate that 601,027 (426,369–793,663) were due to violence."

These figures would be equivalent to 2.5% of the total Iraqi population dying since the start of the war.

This second study drew criticism from a number of sources. Members of the Iraqi government, the Iraq Body Count Project, and a number of other researchers all disputed the estimated figures from 2006.

== Politics ==
Roberts campaigned for office in 2006, running in the Democratic primary for the U.S. House of Representatives seat of the 24th Congressional District in Chenango County, New York. He withdrew from the running on May 17 and endorsed Michael Arcuri, who was later elected.
