= Salih al-Hasnawi =

Iraqi doctor and politician

- صالح الحسناوي

Minister of Health
- Incumbent
- Assumed office 27 October 2022
- Prime Minister: Mohammed Shia' Al Sudani
- Preceded by: Hani al-Aqabi
- In office 2007–2010
- Prime Minister: Nuri al-Maliki
- Preceded by: Ali al-Shemari
- Succeeded by: Majeed Hamaan Ameen

Personal details
- Born: 1960 (age 65–66) Karbala, Iraq
- Party: Non-partisan
- Education: University of Baghdad
- Profession: Psychiatrist; Politician

Salih Mahdi Muttalib al-Hasnawi (Arabic: صالح مهدي مطلب الحسناوي) is an Iraqi psychiatrist, professor, public health expert, and politician. Al-Hasnawi is the current Minister of Health since 28 October 2022. He is an independent politician.

== Early life and education ==
Al-Hasnawi was born in 1960 into a Shia muslim family in the city of Karbala. He attended the University of Baghdad and graduated in 1984 with a degree in medicine. He subsequently specialised in psychiatry.

== Career ==
He was Minister of Health in the cabinet of Nuri al-Maliki during 2007–2010.

He worked professionally as a mental health doctor and was a consultant psychiatrist and Director of Health for Karbala before being appointed to the post of Health Minister.

In January 2008 he reported the results of the Iraq Family Health Survey of 9,345 households across Iraq which was carried out in 2006 and 2007 for the World Health Organization and published in the New England Journal of Medicine. It estimated that there had been 151,000 deaths from violence (95% uncertainty range, 104,000 to 223,000) from March 2003 through June 2006.

Commenting on this survey, al-Hasnawi said "I believe in these numbers," and described the survey as "a very sound survey with accurate methodology" and said that it indicated "a massive death toll since the beginning of the conflict."

In 2017 he was a candidate for the post of Director-General of UNESCO.

== Minister of Health ==
Political offices
Preceded by Ali al-Shemari	Health Minister of Iraq; 2007–2010	Succeeded by Majeed Hamad Ameen
Preceded by Hani al-Aqabi	Health Minister of Iraq; 2022–present	Succeeded by None

== Accolades and fellowships ==
Al Hasnawi is the first Iraqi and Arab physician to win the Presidential Medal of the Royal College of Psychiatrists, Edinburgh, for his vital role in the improvement of mental health in Iraq and the Middle East. He also had the Fellowship of the faculty of public health (UK) 2011 and a temporary adviser WHO - EMRO in mental health and research for health.
