= Iraq Body Count project =

Web-based effort to chronicle casualties of the U.S. invasion and war in Iraq

Iraq Body Count
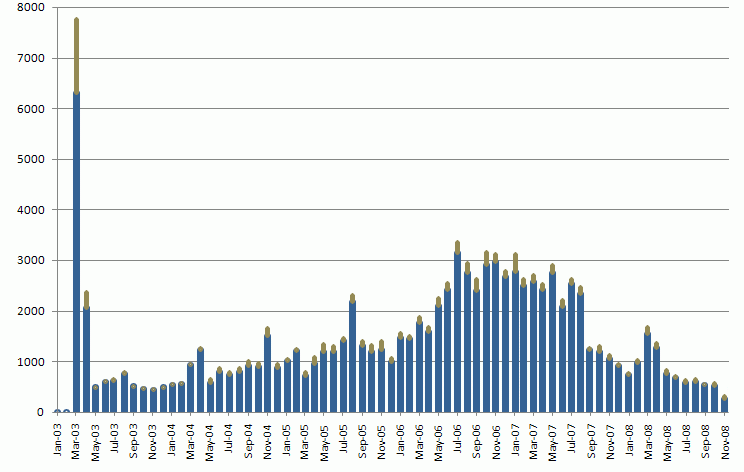
- Monthly civilian casualties, compiled from the Iraq Body Count project database (January 2003 – November 2008)
- URL: www.iraqbodycount.org

Iraq Body Count project (IBC) is a web-based effort to record civilian deaths resulting from the US-led 2003 invasion of Iraq. Included are deaths attributable to coalition and insurgent military action, sectarian violence and criminal violence, which refers to excess civilian deaths caused by criminal action resulting from the breakdown in law and order which followed the coalition invasion. As of February 2019, the IBC has recorded 183,249 – 205,785 civilian deaths. The IBC has a media-centered approach to counting and documenting the deaths. Other sources have provided differing estimates of deaths, some much higher. See Casualties of the Iraq War.

The project uses reports from English-language news media (including Arabic media translated into English), NGO-based reports, and official records that have been released into the public sphere to compile a running total. On its database page the IBC states: "Gaps in recording and reporting suggest that even our highest totals to date may be missing many civilian deaths from violence." The group is staffed by volunteers consisting mainly of academics and activists based in the UK and the US. The project was founded by John Sloboda and Hamit Dardagan.

According to Jonathan Steele, writing in The Guardian, IBC "is widely considered as the most reliable database of Iraqi civilian deaths". But some researchers regard it at best as a floor, or baseline for mortality, and that it underestimates actual mortality by potentially several factors.

== Project statement ==
The IBC overview page states:

"This is an ongoing human security project which maintains and updates the world's only independent and comprehensive public database of media-reported civilian deaths in Iraq that have resulted from the 2003 military intervention by the USA and its allies. The count includes civilian deaths caused by coalition military action and by military or paramilitary responses to the coalition presence (e.g. insurgent and terrorist attacks). It also includes excess civilian deaths caused by criminal action resulting from the breakdown in law and order which followed the coalition invasion."

The project quotes the top US general in Iraq, Tommy Franks, as saying "We don't do body counts". Franks gave this terse answer ("You know we don't do body counts") at Bagram Air Base in answer to journalists' questions on counting casualties during Operation Anaconda in Afghanistan.

== Method ==
The IBC overview page states: "Deaths in the database are derived from a comprehensive survey of commercial media and NGO-based reports, along with official records that have been released into the public sphere. Reports range from specific, incident based accounts to figures from hospitals, morgues, and other documentary data-gathering agencies."

Project volunteers sample news stories to extract minimum and maximum numbers of civilian casualties. Each incident reported at least by two independent news sources is included in the Iraq Body Count database. In December 2007, IBC announced that they would begin to include deaths reported by one source, and that the number of deaths provided by such reports would be openly tracked on its database page. Between 3.3 and 3.5 percent of deaths recorded by IBC are currently listed on the database page as derived from a single source.

IBC is purely a civilian count. IBC defines civilian to exclude Iraqi soldiers, insurgents, suicide bombers or any others directly engaged in war-related violence. A "min" and "max" figure are used where reports differ on the numbers killed, or where the civilian status of the dead is uncertain.

IBC is not an "estimate" of total civilian deaths based on projections or other forms of extrapolation. It is a compilation of documented deaths, as reported by English-language media worldwide. See the sources section farther down for more info on the media and their sources.

Some have suggested bias of sources could affect the count. If a number is quoted from an anti-coalition source, and the Allies fail to give a sufficiently specific alternate number, the anti-coalition figure is entered into IBC's database as both a maximum and a minimum. The same works vice versa. The project argues that these potential over- and undercounts by different media sources would tend to balance out.

IBC's online database shows the newspaper, magazine or website where each number is reported, and the date on which it was reported. However, this has been criticized as insufficient because it typically does not list the original sources for the information: that is, the NGO, journalist or government responsible for the number presented. Hence, any inherent bias due to the lack of reliable reports from independent or Allied sources is not readily available to the reader.

== Sources ==
The IBC overview page states that its sources include "public domain newsgathering agencies with web access". They include sources that are from sites updated at least once a day, are "separately archived on the site, with a unique URL", are "widely cited or referenced by other sources", are in English, and have "fully public (preferably free) web-access"

Primary sources used by the media are listed in the 2003 to 2005 IBC report. The sources are followed by the number of deaths reported from that source.

- Mortuaries. 8,913
- Medics. 4,846
- Iraqi officials. 4,376
- Eyewitnesses. 3,794
- Police. 3,588
- Relatives. 2,780
- US-Coalition. 2,423
- Journalists. 1,976
- NGOs. 732
- Friends/Associates. 596
- Other. 196

== Web counters ==
The IBC overview page states: "Results and totals are continually updated and made immediately available here and on various IBC web counters which may be freely displayed on any website or homepage, where they are automatically updated without further intervention."

== Body counts change over time ==
Civilian deaths in the Iraq war (cumulative):

Date	Min	Max
9 April 2003	996	1,174
10 August 2003	6,087	7,798
25 April 2004	8,918	10,769
12 September 2004	11,797	13,806
12 March 2005	16,231	18,510
6 December 2005	27,354	30,863
28 June 2006	38,725	43,140
2 October 2006	43,546	48,343
1 March 2007	57,482	63,421
5 August 2007	68,347	74,753
2 May 2008	83,336	90,897
24 October 2010	98,585	107,594
12 January 2012	104,594	114,260
1 January 2018	180,093	201,873
1 January 2019	182,769	205,191
1 January 2020	184,776	207,645
1 January 2021	185,497	208,547

The figures above are those that appeared in real time on the IBC counters on or around those dates. However, those in the first line were increased radically in the following days and weeks. IBC's current Max figure for the entire invasion phase, up to 30 April 2003, now stands at 7,299. Because IBC performs analyses (e.g., accounts for multiple reports, eliminates overlaps, etc.), there is always a delay between the date on which incidents occur and the addition of their numbers to the IBC database. Another factor is that some reports emerge weeks or even months later – for instance the emergence of Baghdad city morgue reports for 2005 in early 2006. The 6 December line above was taken from the IBC total as it stood on 6 December 2005, but the emergence of the morgue figures later increased IBC's figures for that period to 31,818–35,747. The majority of civilians death from 2003 to 2011 were attributed to unknown actors.

== Cumulative updated body counts table ==
Following are the yearly IBC Project violent civilian death totals, broken down by month from the beginning of 2003. Table below is copied irregularly from the source page, and is soon out-of-date as data is continually updated at the source. As of 12 June 2023 the top of the IBC database page with the table says 186,901 – 210,296 "Documented civilian deaths from violence". That page also says: "Gaps in recording and reporting suggest that even our highest totals to date may be missing many civilian deaths from violence."

Monthly civilian deaths from violence, 2003 onwards
	Jan	Feb	Mar	Apr	May	Jun	Jul	Aug	Sep	Oct	Nov	Dec	Yearly totals
2003	3	2	3986	3448	545	597	646	833	566	515	487	524	12,152
2004	610	663	1004	1303	655	910	834	878	1042	1033	1676	1129	11,737
2005	1222	1297	905	1145	1396	1347	1536	2352	1444	1311	1487	1141	16,583
2006	1546	1579	1957	1805	2279	2594	3298	2865	2567	3041	3095	2900	29,526
2007	3035	2680	2728	2573	2854	2219	2702	2483	1391	1326	1124	997	26,112
2008	861	1093	1669	1317	915	755	640	704	612	594	540	586	10,286
2009	372	409	438	590	428	564	431	653	352	441	226	478	5,382
2010	267	305	336	385	387	385	488	520	254	315	307	218	4,167
2011	389	254	311	289	381	386	308	401	397	366	288	392	4,162
2012	531	356	377	392	304	529	469	422	400	290	253	299	4,622
2013	357	360	403	545	888	659	1145	1013	1306	1180	870	1126	9,852
2014	1097	972	1029	1037	1100	4088	1580	3340	1474	1738	1436	1327	20,218
2015	1490	1625	1105	2013	1295	1355	1845	1991	1445	1297	1021	1096	17,578
2016	1374	1258	1459	1192	1276	1405	1280	1375	935	1970	1738	1131	16,393
2017	1119	982	1918	1816	1871	1858	1498	597	490	397	346	291	13,183
2018	474	410	402	303	229	209	230	201	241	305	160	155	3,319
2019	323	271	123	140	167	130	145	93	151	361	274	215	2,393
2020	114	148	73	52	74	64	49	82	54	70	74	54	908
2021	64	56	49	66	49	46	87	60	41	65	23	63	669
2022	62	46	42	31	82	44	67	80	68	63	65	90	740
2023	56	52	76	85	45								314

== 2006 ==
The Iraq Body Count project states for the week ending 31 December 2006: "It was a truly violent year, as around 24,000 civilians lost their lives in Iraq. This was a massive rise in violence: 14,000 had been killed in 2005, 10,500 in 2004 and just under 12,000 in 2003 (7,000 of them killed during the actual war, while only 5,000 killed during the 'peace' that followed in May 2003). In December 2006 alone around 2,800 civilians were reported killed. This week there were over 560 civilian deaths reported."

From the above quote here are IBC yearly death totals (not counting the initial 7000 invasion deaths):

- 2003: 5,000
- 2004: 10,500
- 2005: 14,000
- 2006: 24,000

== March 2003 to March 2005 report ==
The IBC released a report detailing the civilian deaths it had recorded between 20 March 2003 and 19 March 2005. From page 26: "The analyses in this dossier cover the first two years of the military intervention in Iraq from 20 March 2003 to 19 March 2005, and are based on data which was available by 14 June 2005."

The report says the US and its allies were responsible for the largest share (37%) of the 24,865 deaths. The remaining deaths were attributed to anti-occupation forces (9%), crime (36%), and unknown agents (11%).

Who did the killing?

- 37%. US-led forces killed 37% of civilian victims.
- 9%. Anti-occupation forces/insurgents killed 9% of civilian victims.
- 36%. Post-invasion criminal violence accounted for 36% of all deaths.
- 11%. Unknown agents (11%).

Killings by anti-occupation forces, crime and unknown agents have shown a steady rise over the entire period.

Who was killed?

- 24,865 civilians were reported killed in the first two years.
- Men accounted for over 80% of all civilian deaths.
- Baghdad alone recorded almost half of all deaths.

When did they die?

- 30% of civilian deaths occurred during the invasion phase before 1 May 2003.
- Post-invasion, the number of civilians killed was almost twice as high in year two (11,351) as in year one (6,215).

What was the most lethal weaponry?

- Over half (53%) of all civilian deaths involved explosive devices.
- Air strikes caused most (64%) of the explosives deaths.
- Children were disproportionately affected by all explosive devices but most severely by air strikes and unexploded ordnance (including cluster bomblets).

How many were injured?

- At least 42,500 civilians were reported wounded.
- The invasion phase caused 41% of all reported injuries.
- Explosive weaponry caused a higher ratio of injuries to deaths than small arms.
- The highest wounded-to-death ratio incidents occurred during the invasion phase.

== Iraq War Logs ==
In October 2010, the group WikiLeaks released the Iraq War Logs, a set of nearly 400,000 classified US military documents on the Iraq war. IBC was among several media organizations and NGO's given pre-release access to the documents, and IBC co-founder John Sloboda delivered a speech at the press conference for the release by WikiLeaks.

IBC published three pieces on their website detailing their analysis of the war logs. Among the main findings were that the war logs, "contain an estimated 15,000 previously unknown civilian deaths," and that addition of the new material would suggest that, "over 150,000 violent deaths have been recorded since March 2003, with more than 122,000 (80%) of them civilian."

== Academic publications ==
Between 2009 and 2011, IBC published three papers in peer reviewed academic journals, co-authored with researchers from King's College London and Royal Holloway, University of London. Each paper uses IBC data to evaluate different aspects of civilian casualties during the war.

The first paper, published in the New England Journal of Medicine in April 2009, analyses civilian deaths between 2003 and 2008 according to weapon types used. Among the findings were that, "execution after abduction or capture was the single most common form of death overall," and that, "events involving air attacks and mortar fire were the most dangerous" to Iraqi females and children.

The second paper, published in PLoS Medicine in February 2011, analyses civilian deaths between 2003 and 2008 according to perpetrator, weapon, time, and location. The paper found that most deaths during the period were, "inflicted by unknown perpetrators, primarily through extrajudicial executions." The paper also utilized what the authors refer to as the "Dirty War Index" which evaluates the behavior of different perpetrators or weapon types in terms of the proportion of women and children killed, with higher DWI ratios suggesting tactics or weapons that are more indiscriminate toward civilians. The study found that unknown perpetrators firing mortars had the highest DWI ratio, followed by Coalition Forces air attacks, leading the authors to advise that such weapons should not be used in populated areas.

The third paper, published in September, 2011, in a special edition of The Lancet for the 10 year anniversary of the September 11 attacks of 2001, focused on casualties of both civilians and Coalition soldiers specifically by suicide bomb attacks in Iraq between 2003 and 2010. This paper found that there had been at least 12,284 Iraqi civilians and 200 Coalition soldiers killed in at least 1,003 suicide bombings during the period. The study also found that these bombings had "injured no fewer than 30,644 Iraqi civilians," and that, "children are less likely to survive their suicide bomb injuries than adults."

== Criticisms and counter-criticisms ==
The IBC has received criticism from multiple sides. Some critics have focused on potential bias of sources. Others have raised concerns about the difficulty of distinguishing civilians from combatants. Others have criticized it for over or undercounting.

Some critics, often on the political right, claimed that the IBC numbers were an overcount, and that the numbers were suspect due to the antiwar bias of the IBC members. For example; 26 July 2005 National Review article, "Bad Counts. An unquestioning media."

Others, often on the political left, criticized media and government willingness to quote IBC figures more approvingly than the much higher estimate coming from the Lancet study that came out in October 2004.

Journalists included Lila Guterman, John Pilger, and George Monbiot.

In a 27 January 2005 article in The Chronicle of Higher Education Lila Guterman wrote:

The Lancet released the paper on 29 October, the Friday before the election, when many reporters were busy with political coverage. That day, the Los Angeles Times and the Chicago Tribune each dedicated only about 400 words to the study and placed the articles inside their front sections, on Pages A4 and A11, respectively. (The news media in Europe gave the study much more play; many newspapers put articles about it on their front pages.) In a short article about the study on Page A8, The New York Times noted that the Iraq Body Count, a project to tally civilian deaths reported in the news media, had put the maximum death toll at around 17,000. The new study, the article said, 'is certain to generate intense controversy.' But the Times has not published any further news articles about the paper.

This view of IBC was based on the belief that IBC figures are extremely low due to pro-US media bias and inadequate reporting due to its heavy (though not exclusive) reliance on Western media sources, which has led some of these critics to claim IBC should be called the "Iraq Western Media Body Count". These biases and inadequacies, they claim, mean IBC's count is low by up to a factor of 10, and that it specifically minimizes the proportion of deaths caused by US forces.

Stephen Soldz wrote a 5 February 2006 article titled "When Promoting Truth Obscures the Truth: More on Iraqi Body Count and Iraqi Deaths". It stated: "Of course, in conditions of active rebellion, the safer areas accessible to Western reporters are likely to be those under US/Coalition control, where deaths are, in turn, likely to be due to insurgent attacks. Areas of insurgent control, which are likely to be subject to US and Iraqi government attack, for example most of Anbar province, are simply off-limits to these reporters. Thus, the realities of reporting imply that reporters will be witness to a larger fraction of deaths due to insurgents and a lesser proportion of deaths due to US and Iraqi government forces."

A further claim has been that IBC does little or nothing to correct misuse of their figures by public officials or media organizations. It is claimed that the media often misuse IBC's estimate of the total number dead. It is also claimed that the media use the IBC's estimate in order to ignore or downplay the October 2004 excess mortality study published in the Lancet Medical Journal, which estimated a far higher figure. Critics of IBC argue that the Lancet study is the most accurate estimate so far and is more reliable than IBC's estimate.

Other criticism of various kinds came from journalists Stephen Soldz, Dahr Jamail, and Jeff Pflueger.

In April 2006, IBC published a lengthy response to their critics entitled "Speculation is no substitute: a defence of Iraq Body Count". In their reply, IBC argues that their critics have several key facts wrong. IBC argues that while their estimate is likely to be below the full toll, their critics' errors have led the critics to exaggerate the likely extent of such an undercount. Finally, IBC argues, the available evidence does not support their critics' claims of a pro-US bias infecting the IBC database.

=== English-language versus Arabic-language media sources ===
The IBC report for March 2003 to March 2005 states: "We have not made use of Arabic or other non-English language sources, except where these have been published in English. The reasons are pragmatic. We consider fluency in the language of the published report to be a key requirement for accurate analysis, and English is the only language in which all team members are fluent. It is possible that our count has excluded some victims as a result."

Stephen Soldz, who runs the website "Iraq Occupation and Resistance Report", writes in a 5 February 2006 ZNet article (in reference to the 2003-2005 IBC report): "Given, as indicated in that report, that ten media outlets provided over half the IBC reports and three agencies [Associated Press, Agence France Presse, and Reuters] provided over a third of the reports, there is simply no reason to believe that even a large fraction of Iraqi civilian combat-related deaths are ever reported in the Western media, much less, have the two independent reports necessary to be recorded in the IBC database. Do these few agencies really have enough Iraqi reporters on retainer to cover the country? Are these reporters really able comprehensively to cover deaths in insurgent-held parts of Iraq? How likely is it that two reporters from distinct media outlets are going to be present at a given site where deaths occur? How many of the thousands of US bombings have been investigated by any reporter, Western or Iraqi? Simply to state these questions is to emphasize the fragmentary nature of the reporting that occurs and thus the limitations of the IBC database."

In a 28 April 2006 BBC Newsnight interview the IBC project's co-founder John Sloboda, in response to these and similar arguments, has said: "we have never had over the entire three years, anyone show us an Arabic source that reports deaths that we haven't already got. In three years. In thousands of incidents. There are organisations that translate Arabic reports into English, and we see their data."

IBC monitors multiple Arabic sources that either publish in English as well as Arabic, or are translated by other sources. Some of these include:

Al Arabiya TV, Al-Furat, Al-Ittihad, Al Jazeera (Web), Al Jazeera TV, Al Sharqiyah TV, Al-Taakhi, Al-Bawaba, Arab News, Arabic News, Asharq Al Awsat, As-Sabah, Arab Times, Bahrain News Agency, Bahrain Times.

=== Undercounting ===
The IBC acknowledges on its website that its count is bound to be low due to limitations in reporting stating; "many if not most civilian casualties will go unreported by the media. That is the sad nature of war." IBC's critics claim, though, that the IBC does not do enough to indicate what they believe is the full extent of the undercounting. IBC has directly disputed these claims in a lengthy document on its website.

One criticism of IBC's method, from MIT's John Tirman, a principal research scientist, is that the "surveillance instrument" – the news media – is changing all the time: media organizations add or (more likely) subtract reporters from the field, which was happening in Iraq; reporters were largely confined to Baghdad during the worst violence; and reporters tended to write about spectacular events, like car bombs, when much of the violence was in the form of revenge killings throughout Iraq. "As a result, this technique of totaling up the dead is incapable of accounting for the deaths that were not being recorded, whether by the English-language news media or the chaotic health care system." IBC itself radically changed its method in the middle of the war, switching from two references to one reference in the news media.

The October 2006 Lancet study states: "Aside from Bosnia, we can find no conflict situation where passive surveillance recorded more than 20% of the deaths measured by population-based methods."

In an April 2006 article the IBC had described an example comparing itself to the 2004 United Nations Development Programme Iraq Living Conditions Survey (ILCS). The Lancet report uses the population estimates drawn from the ILCS study, while not mentioning its estimate of war-related deaths. IBC contends that ILCS is a more reliable indicator of violent deaths than the Lancet study, and suggests a much lower number than the Lancet study.

However, a supplement to the Lancet study published separately by its authors, as well as subsequent interviews with one of Lancet's authors have disputed the methodology and results of the ILCS study. On the other hand, Jon Pedersen, author of the ILCS study, has disputed the methodology and results of the Lancet study. For more info on this controversy see the sections titled "Criticisms" and "UNDP ILCS study compared to Lancet study" in Lancet surveys of Iraq War casualties.

The 2006 Lancet study also states: "In several outbreaks, disease and death recorded by facility-based methods underestimated events by a factor of ten or more when compared with population-based estimates. Between 1960 and 1990, newspaper accounts of political deaths in Guatemala correctly reported over 50% of deaths in years of low violence but less than 5% in years of highest violence."

The Lancet reference used is to Patrick Ball, Paul Kobrak, and Herbert F. Spirer and their 1999 book, State Violence in Guatemala, 1960-1996: A Quantitative Reflection. From the introduction: "The CIIDH database consists of cases culled from direct testimonies and documentary and press sources."

Chapter 10 elaborates, saying that "In the CIIDH project, participating popular organizations collected many of the testimonies long after the time of the killings, when people were less clear about details, especially the identities of all the victims." And says, "Typically, during the collection of testimonies, a surviving witness might provide the names of one or two victims, perhaps close relatives, while estimating the number of other neighbors in the community without giving their names."

They report in chapter 7:

Figure 7.1 shows that in the CIIDH database, most of the information for human rights violations prior to 1977 comes from press sources. ... Approximately 10,890 cases were coded from the newspapers. Sixty-three percent of the press cases were taken from Prensa Libre, 10 percent from El Gráfico, 8 percent from La Hora and El Impacto respectively, and 6 percent from El Imparcial. The remaining 5 percent is made up by eight other newspapers.

But also in chapter 7 they reported that in later, more violent years:

When the level of violence increased dramatically in the late 1970s and early 1980s, numbers of reported violations in the press stayed very low. In 1981, one of the worst years of state violence, the numbers fall towards zero. The press reported almost none of the rural violence.

There is a list of figures, tables, and charts in the book that can be used to calculate what percentage of their cases of killings by state forces were reported by 13 Guatemalan newspapers for each year when compared to the testimonies of witnesses (as previously described from chapter 10).

In a 7 November 2004 press release concerning the October 2004 Lancet study the IBC states: "We have always been quite explicit that our own total is certain to be an underestimate of the true position, because of gaps in reporting or recording".

One of the sources used by the media is morgues. Only the central Baghdad area morgue has released figures consistently. While that is the largest morgue in Iraq and in what is often claimed to be the most consistently violent area, the absence of comprehensive morgue figures elsewhere leads to undercounting. IBC makes it clear that, due to these issues, its count will almost certainly be below the full toll in its 'Quick FAQ' on its homepage.

Quote from an IBC note: "The Iraq Body Count (IBC) estimate for x350, like that for x334, was made possible by examination of the detailed data supplied to the Associated Press (AP) by the morgues surveyed in AP's 23 May 2004 survey of Iraqi morgues."

That 23 May 2004 Associated Press article points out the lack of morgue data from multiple areas of Iraq. Also, it states: "The [Baghdad] figure does not include most people killed in big terrorist bombings, Hassan said. The cause of death in such cases is obvious so bodies are usually not taken to the morgue, but given directly to victims' families. Also, the bodies of killed fighters from groups like the al-Mahdi Army are rarely taken to morgues."

== See also ==
- Casualties of the Iraq War. An overview of multiple casualty estimates.
- Iraq War. Infobox there has the most up-to-date casualty figures.
- Lancet surveys of Iraq War casualties
- ORB survey of Iraq War casualties
- Iraq Family Health Survey
