= Hakim al-Zamili =

Iraqi politician

Hakim Abbas Mousa Abbas al-Zamili is an Iraqi politician from the Sadrist Movement who was Deputy Health Minister from May 2006 until April 2007. Since January 2022, he is the First Deputy Speaker of the House of Representatives (Parliament).

== Health Ministry ==
al-Zamili was deputy minister during the height of the sectarian conflict in Iraq. Whilst he was at the ministry, he was accused of running death squads that used ambulances and hospitals to kidnap and murder Sunni Arabs. U.S. troops arrested al-Zamili in February 2007, accusing him of funneling money to private militias. He was also accused of kidnapping in November 2006 another Deputy Health Minister, Ammar al-Saffar, from the Shiite Dawa Party, who had allegedly compiled a dossier of his crimes that he was going to hand over to the Prime Minister. He was cleared of all charges when key witnesses failed to show up after facing alleged intimidation.

== Member of parliament ==
He was listed fifteenth on the list of the Iraqi National Alliance slate for the 2010 Iraqi parliamentary election. He was elected and in January 2011 was appointed to the security committee. Zamili is currently the head of Parliament's security and defense committee.

He was re-elected to parliament in the 2021 Iraqi parliamentary election. He was elected deputy speaker of parliament in January 2022.
