= ORB survey of Iraq War casualties =

2007 and 2008 estimates

On Friday, 14 September 2007, ORB International, an independent polling agency located in London, published estimates of the total war casualties in Iraq since the US-led invasion of Iraq in 2003. At over 1.2 million deaths (1,220,580), this estimate is the highest number published so far. From the poll margin of error of +/-2.5% ORB calculated a range of 733,158 to 1,446,063 deaths. The ORB estimate was performed by a random survey of 1,720 adults aged 18+, out of which 1,499 responded, in fifteen of the eighteen governorates within Iraq, between August 12 and August 19, 2007. In comparison, the 2006 Lancet survey suggested almost half this number (654,965 deaths) through the end of June 2006. The Lancet authors calculated a range of 392,979 to 942,636 deaths.

On 28 January 2008, ORB published an update based on additional work carried out in rural areas of Iraq. Some 600 additional interviews were undertaken September 20 to 24, 2007. As a result of this the death estimate was revised to 1,033,000 with a given range of 946,000 to 1,120,000. As well as estimating the number of deaths the ORB poll also showed that despite the violence only 26% of Iraqis preferred life under Saddam Hussein's regime, while 49% said that they preferred life under the current political system. A majority (53%) felt the security situation would improve in the immediate weeks following a withdrawal of the MNF.

== Survey question and results ==
Participants of the ORB survey were asked the following question:

How many members of your household, if any, have died as a result of the conflict in Iraq since 2003 (ie as a result of violence rather than a natural death such as old age)? Please note that I mean those who were actually living under your roof.

The revised results were

Number of deaths in household	Percent of responders
None	72%
One	14%
Two	3%
Three	1%
Four or more	"figure more than zero but less than 0.5%"
Don't know	2%
No answer	8%

== Causes of death ==
ORB reported that "48% died from a gunshot wound, 20% from the impact of a car bomb, 9% from aerial bombardment, 6% as a result of an accident and 6% from another blast/ordnance."

== Methodology ==
From the September 14, 2007 ORB press release concerning the first set of interviews:

- Results are based on face-to-face interviews amongst a nationally representative sample of 1,720 adults aged 18+ throughout Iraq (1,499 agreed to answer the question on household deaths)
- The standard margin of error on the sample who answered (1,499) is +2.5%
- The methodology uses multi-stage random probability sampling and covers fifteen of the eighteen governorates within Iraq. For security reasons Karbala and Al Anbar were not included. Irbil was excluded as the authorities refused the field team a permit.

Their pollster was Dr. Munqeth Daghir, founding director of the Independent Institute for Administration and Civil Society Studies (IIACS). ORB described IIACSS as a “polling/ research company established in Iraq in 2003 and which has a network of interviewers covering all regions of the country."

ORB is a member of the British Polling Council.

== Estimated range of deaths ==
The 2005 census reported 4,050,597 households. From this ORB calculated 1,220,580 deaths since the 2003 invasion. From the poll margin of error of 2.5% ORB came up with a range of 733,158 to 1,446,063 deaths.

== January 2008 update: 1,033,000 deaths ==
Opinion Research Business published an update to the survey on 28 January 2008, based on additional work carried out in rural areas of Iraq. Some 600 additional interviews were undertaken and as a result of this the death estimate was revised to 1,033,000 with a given range of 946,000 to 1,120,000.

== See also ==
- Casualties of the Iraq War. An overview of many casualty estimates.
- Iraq War. Infobox there has the most up-to-date casualty figures.
- Lancet surveys of Iraq War casualties
- Iraq Family Health Survey
