= United Nations Security Council Resolution 778 =

UN Security Council Resolution 778
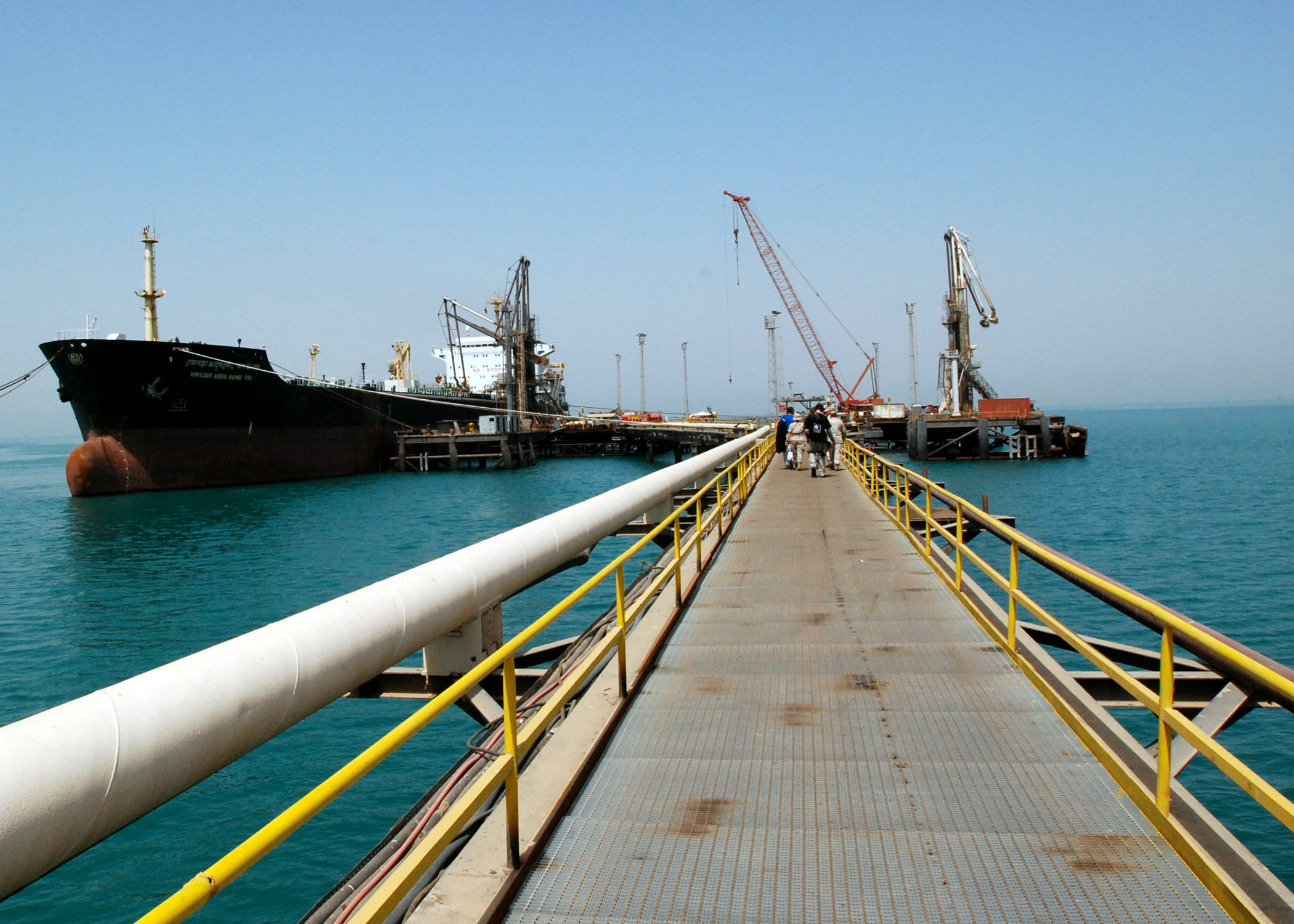
- Iraqi oil platform
- Date: 2 October 1992
- Meeting no.: 3,117
- Code: S/RES/778 (Document)
- Subject: Iraq–Kuwait
- Voting summary: 14 voted for; None voted against; 1 abstained
- Result: Adopted

Security Council composition
- Permanent members: China; France; Russia; United Kingdom; United States
- Non-permanent members: Austria; Belgium; Cape Verde; Ecuador; Hungary; India; Japan; Morocco; Venezuela; Zimbabwe

United Nations Security Council resolution 778, adopted on 2 October 1992, after recalling resolutions 687 (1991), 688 (1991), 692 (1991), 699 (1991), 706 (1991) and 712 (1991), the council, acting under Chapter VII, decided to authorise states holding funds from the sale of Iraqi petroleum to transfer funds to the escrow account under resolutions 706 and 712, of which 30 per cent would be transferred to the United Nations Compensation Commission.

The resolution noted that the transfer of funds by a state need not exceed US$200 million, and may exclude from the operation any funds which have already been released to a claimant or supplier prior to the adoption of the current resolution. It also decided that all states should take steps to purchase or arrange for the sale of Iraqi petroleum or petroleum products at fair market value and then transfer funds to the escrow account.

The Council then decided that states, including banks and other bodies, should provide the Secretary-General Boutros Boutros-Ghali with any information needed to ensure effective implementation of the resolution. It also requested the Secretary-General to:

(a) ascertain the whereabouts and amounts of the said petroleum products and the aforementioned proceeds of sale;
(b) ascertain the costs of United Nations activities concerning the elimination of weapons of mass destruction, the provision of humanitarian relief in Iraq and other operations;
(c) transfer no more than 30 per cent of Iraq's annual value of its exports of petroleum and petroleum products to the Compensation Commission;
(d) use the remainder of funds for United Nations operations and activities;
(e) repay, from any available funds in the escrow account, any sum transferred to the account or State from which it was transferred, if the transfer is found at any time by him not to have been of funds subject to this resolution.

The resolution stated that the operation of the resolution shall have no effect on rights, debts and claims existing with respect to funds prior to their transfer to the escrow account, and that the accounts from which such funds were transferred shall be kept open for retransfer of the funds in question. It also reiterated that the Compensation Commission and escrow account enjoy all privileges and rights of the United Nations, including immunity from legal proceedings.

The resolution was approved by 14 votes to none, with one abstention from China.

The above measures raised around US$101.5 million, slightly less than the US$106.5 million the Secretary-General estimated.

== See also ==
- Gulf War
- Invasion of Kuwait
- Sanctions against Iraq
- List of United Nations Security Council Resolutions 701 to 800 (1991–1993)
- Oil-for-Food Programme
