= United Nations Security Council Resolution 712 =

UN Security Council Resolution 712
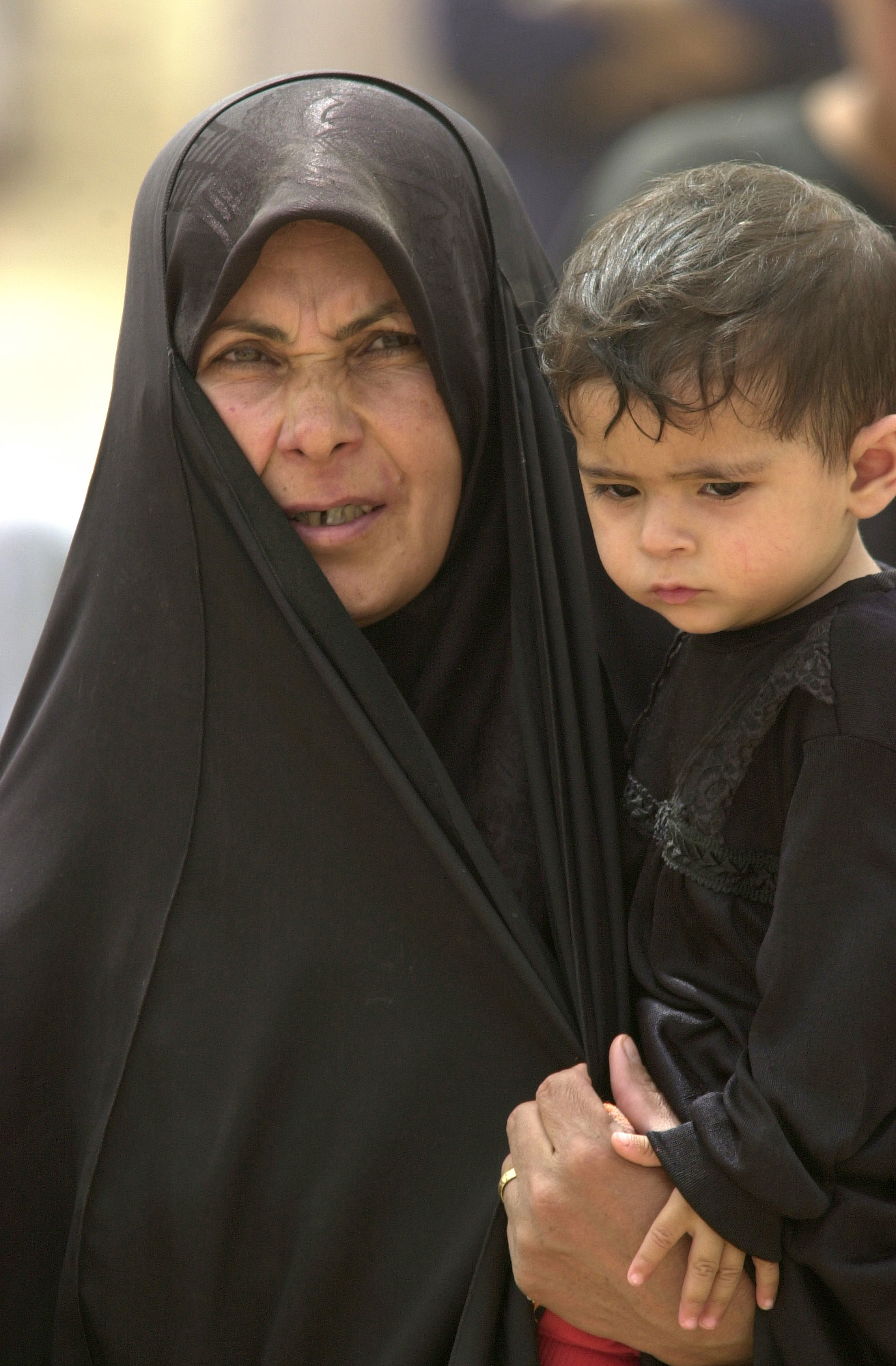
- Iraqi woman and child wait to receive food aid
- Date: 19 September 1991
- Meeting no.: 3,008
- Code: S/RES/712 (Document)
- Subject: Iraq
- Voting summary: 13 voted for; 1 voted against; 1 abstained
- Result: Adopted

Security Council composition
- Permanent members: China; France; Soviet Union; United Kingdom; United States
- Non-permanent members: Austria; Belgium; Côte d'Ivoire; Cuba; Ecuador; India; Romania; Yemen; Zaire; Zimbabwe

United Nations Security Council resolution 712, adopted on 19 September 1991, after recalling resolutions 661 (1990), 686 (1991), 687 (1991), 688 (1991), 692 (1991), 699 (1991), 705 (1991) and 706 (1991), the council, acting under Chapter VII, reaffirmed and discussed provisions of Resolution 706 and called for international co-operation.

The resolution first invited the security Council committee established under Resolution 661 to authorise the release by the Secretary-General Javier Pérez de Cuéllar from the escrow account of the first one-third portion in the United Nations Compensation Commission to finance the purchase foodstuffs, medicines, materials and other supplies for civilian needs. It called on the Secretary-General and the committee to co-operate with the Government of Iraq to ensure an effective implementation of the current resolution, to enable an equitable distribution to meet humanitarian needs.

The council also decided that petroleum and petroleum products while under the Iraqi title are immune from legal proceedings, calling on the domestic systems of other states assure this protection. It also stated that the escrow account, the United Nations Compensation Commission, weapons inspectors and other experts all enjoy the privileges and immunities of the United Nations.

The council finally requested the Secretary-General to take "all actions necessary" to implement the provisions of Resolution 712, and called upon all Member States to co-operate in the implementation of Resolution 706 and the current resolution, especially with regard to petroleum products, medicines and supplies for civilian needs.

Resolution 712 was adopted by 13 votes to one against from Cuba, and one abstention from Yemen. Iraq did not initially accept or reject the provisions outlined.

== See also ==
- Gulf War
- Invasion of Kuwait
- Iraq sanctions
- List of United Nations Security Council Resolutions 701 to 800 (1991–1993)
