= United Nations Security Council Resolution 705 =

UN Security Council Resolution 705
- Date: 15 August 1991
- Meeting no.: 3,004
- Code: S/RES/705 (Document)
- Subject: Iraq
- Voting summary: 15 voted for; None voted against; None abstained
- Result: Adopted

Security Council composition
- Permanent members: China; France; Soviet Union; United Kingdom; United States
- Non-permanent members: Austria; Belgium; Côte d'Ivoire; Cuba; Ecuador; India; Romania; Yemen; Zaire; Zimbabwe

United Nations Security Council resolution 705, adopted unanimously on 15 August 1991, after considering a note by the Secretary-General, the Council decided that compensation paid by Iraq to the United Nations Compensation Commission arising from Resolution 687 (1991) should not exceed 30 per cent of the annual value of its exports of petroleum and petroleum products.

The resolution, passed under Chapter VII of the United Nations Charter, allowed Iraq to export oil in return for humanitarian aid; however this resolution, along with Resolution 712, were both initially rejected by Iraq. Oil exports from Iraq were banned after its invasion of Kuwait on 2 August 1990.

== See also ==
- Foreign relations of Iraq
- Gulf War
- Sanctions against Iraq
- List of United Nations Security Council Resolutions 701 to 800 (1991–1993)
- United Nations Security Council Resolution 706
