= United Nations Security Council Resolution 706 =

UN Security Council Resolution 706
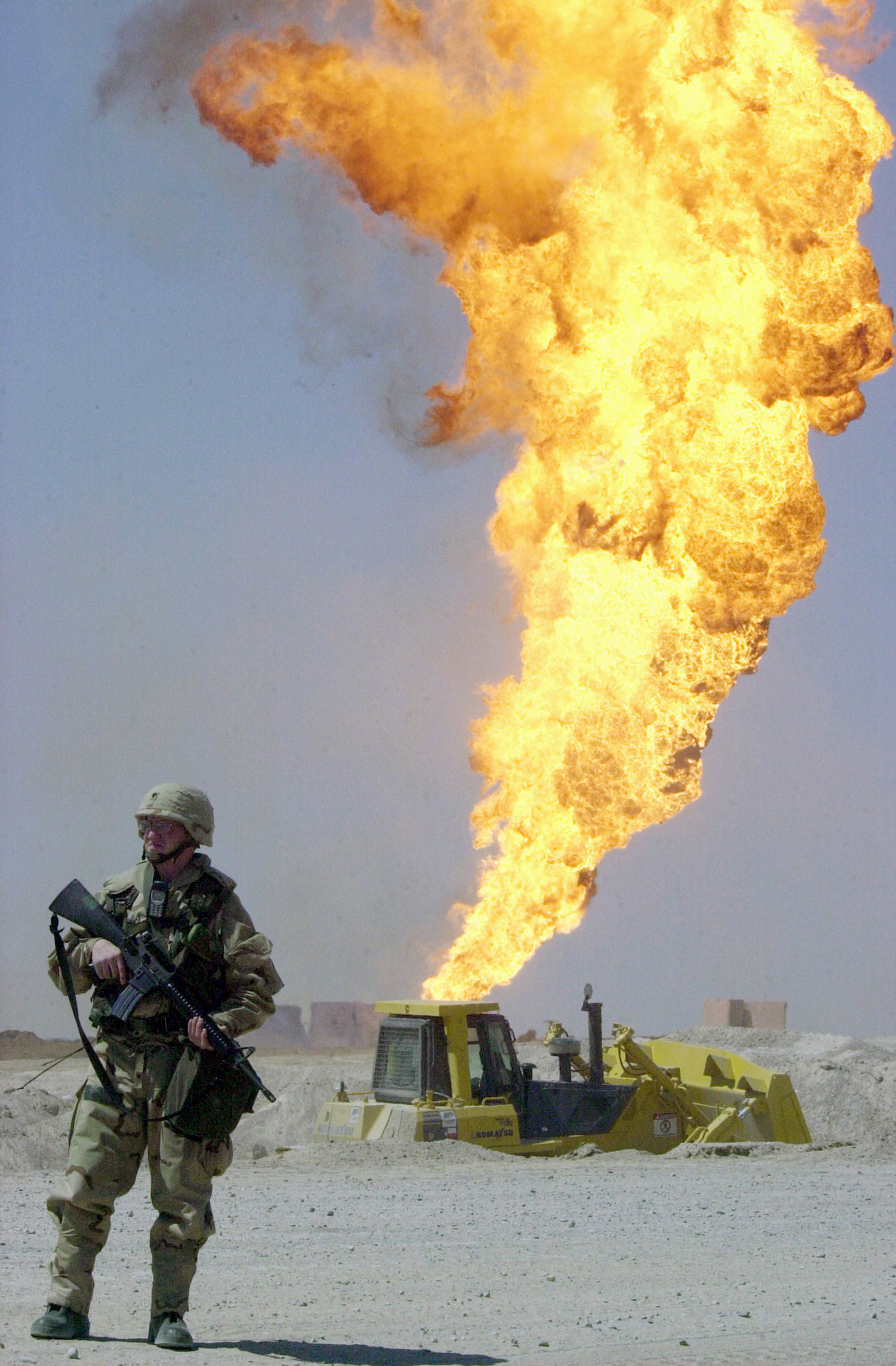
- U.S. soldier and Iraqi oil field
- Date: 15 August 1991
- Meeting no.: 3,004
- Code: S/RES/706 (Document)
- Subject: Iraq–Kuwait
- Voting summary: 13 voted for; 1 voted against; 1 abstained
- Result: Adopted

Security Council composition
- Permanent members: China; France; Soviet Union; United Kingdom; United States
- Non-permanent members: Austria; Belgium; Côte d'Ivoire; Cuba; Ecuador; India; Romania; Yemen; Zaire; Zimbabwe

United Nations Security Council resolution 706 decided on a mechanism to allow Iraq to sell oil in return for humanitarian aid from Member States. The council, acting under Chapter VII, adopted the resolution on 15 August 1991, after recalling resolutions 661 (1990), 686 (1991), 687 (1991), 688 (1991), 692 (1991), 699 (1991) and 705 (1991). The provisions of Resolution 706 functioned in a way similar to that which was later implemented in the Oil-for-Food Programme under Resolution 986 in 1995.

The resolution, co-sponsored by the United States, determined that Iraq could sell up to US$1.6 billion, following approval of each sale by the Security Council Committee established in Resolution 661 (1990). It also decided that part of proceeds from the sale of the oil would be used for payments to the United Nations Compensation Commission to help compensate Kuwait after the Iraqi invasion.

The council went on to request the Secretary-General, in consultation with the International Committee of the Red Cross, to report back within 20 days regarding the implementation of the Resolution 687 regarding the repatriation of Kuwaiti and foreign nationals or their remains present in Iraq. It also requested Iraq report monthly on the gold and foreign currency reserves it held in the country or elsewhere.

Iraq refused to sell the oil under this resolution, claiming it was a violation of its sovereignty and that it imposed a "guardianship" on its people.

Resolution 706 was adopted by 13 votes to one against from Cuba, and one abstention from Yemen.

== See also ==
- Foreign relations of Iraq
- Gulf War
- List of United Nations Security Council Resolutions 701 to 800 (1991–1993)
