= United Nations Security Council Resolution 692 =

UN Security Council Resolution 692
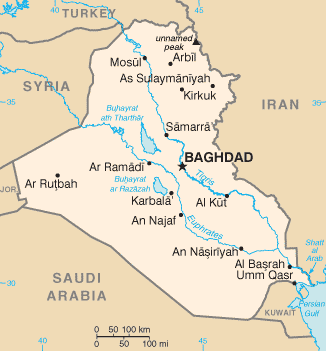
- Iraq
- Date: 20 May 1991
- Meeting no.: 2,987
- Code: S/RES/692 (Document)
- Subject: Iraq–Kuwait
- Voting summary: 14 voted for; None voted against; 1 abstained
- Result: Adopted

Security Council composition
- Permanent members: China; France; Soviet Union; United Kingdom; United States
- Non-permanent members: Austria; Belgium; Côte d'Ivoire; Cuba; Ecuador; India; Romania; Yemen; Zaire; Zimbabwe

United Nations Security Council resolution 692, adopted on 20 May 1991, after recalling resolutions 674 (1990), 686 (1991) and 687 (1991), as well as taking the report by the Secretary-General, the council decided to establish the United Nations Compensation Commission to deal with compensation claims resulting from Iraq's invasion of Kuwait, which subsequently led to the Gulf War.

The council also decided that the Governing Council of the commission will be located in Geneva, would work to implement relevant parts of Resolution 687 (1991), and requested Member States to co-operate with it. It also asked the Governing Council to report as soon as possible on mechanisms for determining Iraq's contribution to the commission, noting that if Iraq refuses to co-operate with the Governing Council, the Security Council may reconsider the prohibition against the import of oil originating in Iraq.

Resolution 692 was adopted for 14 votes to none, with one abstention from Cuba.

== See also ==
- Gulf War
- Invasion of Kuwait
- Iraq–Kuwait relations
- List of United Nations Security Council Resolutions 601 to 700 (1987–1991)
