= United Nations Security Council Resolution 688 =

UN Security Council Resolution 688
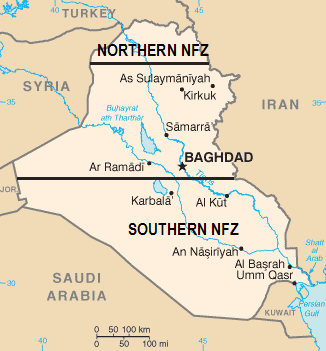
- Iraqi northern and southern no-fly zones
- Date: 5 April 1991
- Meeting no.: 2,982
- Code: S/RES/688 (Document)
- Subject: Iraq
- Voting summary: 10 voted for; 3 voted against; 2 abstained
- Result: Adopted

Security Council composition
- Permanent members: China; France; Soviet Union; United Kingdom; United States
- Non-permanent members: Austria; Belgium; Côte d'Ivoire; Cuba; Ecuador; India; Romania; Yemen; Zaire; Zimbabwe

United Nations Security Council Resolution 688, adopted on 5 April 1991, after receiving letters from the representatives of France, Iran, and Turkey and expressing its concern over political repression of the Iraqi people, including those in Iraqi Kurdistan, the Council condemned the repression and demanded that Iraq, as a contribution to removing the threat to international peace and security, end the repression and respect the human rights of its population.

The Council insisted that Iraq allow access by international humanitarian organizations to the areas affected, requesting the Secretary-General to report on the Iraqi and Kurdish populations affected by repression from the Iraqi authorities, using all resources possible to address the needs of the population. It also demanded Iraq co-operate with the Secretary-General and international organizations to assist in humanitarian aid efforts.

The resolution was adopted by ten votes in favor, three votes against (Cuba, Yemen, and Zimbabwe), and two abstentions (the People's Republic of China and India).

France, the United Kingdom, and United States used Resolution 688 to establish Iraqi no-fly zones to protect humanitarian operations in Iraq, though the resolution made no explicit reference to no-fly zones.

== See also ==
- 1991 uprisings in Iraq
- Gulf War
- Invasion of Kuwait
- Iraqi no-fly zones
- List of United Nations Security Council Resolutions 601 to 700 (1987–1991)
