= United Nations Compensation Commission =

Former subsidiary organ of the UN

The United Nations Compensation Commission (UNCC) was created in 1991 as a subsidiary organ of the United Nations Security Council. Its mandate was to process claims and pay compensation for losses and damage suffered as a direct result of Iraq's 1990–1991 invasion and occupation of Kuwait which started the Gulf War. These losses included claims for loss of property, deaths, loss of natural resources, damage to public health and environmental damage. The work of the UNCC officially came to a close at the end of 2022.

At the first meeting in August 1991, six categories of claims were set up: claims from individuals forced to flee Kuwait between the invasion and the ceasefire (Category A); claims from individuals who (or whose family) suffered injuries or death as a result of the invasion (B); claims from individuals for business losses, pain and anguish, property damage etc. less than $100,000 (C); claims from individuals for business losses, pain and anguish, property damage etc. more than $100,000 (D); claims from corporations and other entities for business (including oil sector) losses (E); and governmental and international agency claims for cost of resettling and providing relief to citizens, claims for damage to government property and to the environment (F). Category E and F claims were further broken down to subcategories.

Each claim category had specific dates for initiating the claim and providing required evidence. A total of over $350 billion in claims was submitted in 2,686,131 claims. Of these claims, 1,543,619 (57%) resulted in some sort of award. The total awarded, to be paid by Iraq from oil revenues, was just over $52 billion. As of January 2021 approximately $50 billion of this total had been paid to claimants, with approximately $2.4 billion remaining to be paid. The UNCC adopted a policy of paying individuals first, with the result that the remaining sum is owed entirely to a government entity, specifically the state oil company of Kuwait. The UNCC is making payments at approximately $1 billion per quarter, depending on the extent of Iraq's oil revenue. In December 2021, Iraq's central bank announced that it had paid off its entire debt of $52 billion in war reparations to Kuwait.

Copies of all major decisions and major evidence in support of claims can be found at the UNCC website.

The process of assessing and awarding claims was begun during the period of Saddam Hussein's stewardship of Iraq. However, many of the claims (especially major claims) were not settled until after a new government was in place in Iraq. Efforts by the Paris Club (an organisation set up by the world's industrialised nations during the 1950s to restructure debt from severely indebted nations) to seek debt forgiveness in order to allow Iraq to use its oil revenues for reconstruction met with some success among wealthy nations with the notable exceptions of Kuwait and Saudi Arabia. Some entities have suggested the concept of odious debt, under which a country should not be held responsible for debt incurred by despotic regime for the purposes of strengthening itself and suppressing internal dissent.

== Process issues ==
From the beginning of its operation, the UNCC system has been criticized for the lack of representation allowed to Iraq, the defendant government, in the process. In particular, no money from Iraq's sales of oil was allowed to be used for Iraq's legal defence.

== Environmental damage ==
Kuwait and Saudi Arabia suffered gross environmental damage as a result of the Iraqi occupation, as the retreating Iraqi forces blew up oil wells and released millions of barrels (estimated as high as 11 million barrels) of crude oil into the Persian Gulf. In Kuwait the damage to the environment was largely terrestrial in the form of tarcrete and oil lakes surrounding the damaged wells. In 2001 the UNCC awarded Kuwait $108 million (to be taken from the Oil-for-Food Programme) to study the effects of the environmental devastation to the desert and the coastline, and the effects of the oil fires on public health. Most of Kuwait's desert is in fact sparse shrubland and capable of sustaining sheep, goats and camels. Little damage was found to Kuwait's shoreline and fishing industry. As a result of these studies, claims were prepared for several billion dollars' worth of damages to the desert ecosystem resulting from the oil fires, uncontrolled oil releases, and military maneuvers by both Iraqi forces and coalition military.

In contrast, the Saudi study (funded with $109 million from the Oil-for-Food Programme via the UNCC) found damage mostly to the coastline. The anti-clockwise current pattern of the Persian Gulf forced the floating spill onto the Saudi coastline and fouled approximately 800 km (250 km as the crow flies) of almost pristine shoreline. Commercial fish stocks (shrimp and fin fish) plummeted but recovered within a few years. An extensive and very detailed study of the shoreline was conducted at 250-meter intervals for the entire affected length, from the high-water mark to low water, to determine the extent of the contamination and its effect on biota. The Saudis claimed several billion dollars to compensate for these environmental damages.
