= List of United Nations Security Council resolutions concerning Iraq =

The United Nations Security Council (UNSC) is the organ of the United Nations charged with maintaining peace and security among nations. While other organs of the United Nations only make recommendations to member governments, the Security Council has the power to make decisions that member governments are obliged to carry out under the United Nations Charter. The decisions of the Council are known as United Nations Security Council Resolutions.

There have been three major events in Iraq's history for which the UN has passed numerous resolutions: the Iran–Iraq War, the Persian Gulf War, and the Iraq disarmament crisis leading up to and following the 2003 invasion of Iraq.

== Iraq related resolutions ==
| Resolution | Date | Vote | Concerns |
|---|---|---|---|
| 479 | 28 September 1980 | Unanimous | Noted the beginning of the Iran–Iraq War. |
| 514 | 12 July 1982 | Unanimous | Called for an end to the Iran–Iraq War. |
| 522 | 4 October 1982 | Unanimous | Called for an end to the Iran–Iraq War. |
| 540 | 31 October 1983 | 12-0-3 | Condemned violations of the Geneva Conventions in the Iran–Iraq War. Malta, Nicaragua, and Pakistan abstained. |
| 582 | 24 February 1986 | Unanimous | "Deplores" the use of chemical weapons in the Iran–Iraq War. |
| 588 | 8 October 1986 | Unanimous | Called for the implementation of resolution 582. |
| 598 | 20 July 1987 | Unanimous | Demanded an immediate cease-fire between Iran and Iraq; requested that the UN Secretary-General start an investigation to determine how the conflict started. |
| 612 | 9 May 1988 | Unanimous | Condemned the use of chemical weapons in the Iran–Iraq War, but did not single out Iraq as the only side to use them. Instead, the resolution said that the Security Council, "Expects both sides to refrain from the future use of chemical weapons." |
| 619 | 9 August 1988 | Unanimous | Created UNIIMOG to observe the implementation of a cease-fire for the Iran–Iraq War. Extended by resolutions 631, 642, 651, 671, 676 and 685. Terminated 28 February 1991. |
| 620 | 26 August 1988 | Unanimous | Condemned the use of chemical weapons in the Iran–Iraq War. |
| 660 | 2 August 1990 | 14-0-1 | Condemned the Iraqi invasion of Kuwait and demanded a withdrawal of Iraqi troops. Supported by resolutions 662, 664, 665, 666, 667, 669, 670, 674, and 677. Yemen abstained. |
| 661 | 6 August 1990 | 13-0-2 | Placed economic sanctions on Iraq in response to the invasion of Kuwait. Cuba and Yemen abstained |
| 678 | 29 November 1990 | 12-2-1 | Authorized use of force against Iraq to "uphold and implement resolution 660 and all subsequent resolutions and to restore international peace and security in the area". Cuba and Yemen voted against the resolution while China abstained. |
| 686 | 2 March 1991 | 11-1-3 | Demanded Iraq's acceptance of all previous resolutions concerning the war with Kuwait. |
| 687 | 3 April 1991 | 12-1-2 | Formal ceasefire ending the Persian Gulf War, with the conditions that Iraq: Destroys all of its chemical and biological weapons and all ballistic missiles with a range greater than 150 km; Agrees not to develop nuclear weapons; Submits a declaration of its weapons programs and voluntarily agrees to on-site inspections.; Cuba voted against the resolution while Ecuador and Yemen abstained. |
| 688 | 5 April 1991 | 10-3-2 | Condemned the repression of Iraqi Kurds. Cuba, Yemen, and Zimbabwe voted against the resolution while China and India abstained. |
| 707 | 15 August 1991 | Unanimous | Demands immediate, complete, full compliance with UNSCR 687. |
| 715 | 11 October 1991 | Unanimous | Approves United Nations Special Commission on Iraq and International Atomic Energy Agency inspection provisions. |
| 833 | 27 May 1993 | Unanimous | Acknowledges clarifications of Iraq-Kuwait border and United Nations Iraq-Kuwait Observation Mission (UNIKOM). |
| 899 | 4 March 1994 | Unanimous | Compensation payments to Iraqi private citizens whose assets remained on Kuwaiti territory following the demarcation of the Iraq-Kuwait border. |
| 949 | 15 October 1994 | Unanimous | Condemned the Iraqi military buildup on Kuwaiti border. |
| 986 | 14 April 1995 | Unanimous | Created the Oil-for-Food Programme. Supported by resolution 1111. |
| 1051 | 27 March 1996 | Unanimous | Created a mechanism to monitor Iraqi "dual use" import and exports. |
| 1060 | 12 June 1996 | Unanimous | Demands Iraq allow access to sites, weapons, transport and equipment by United Nations Special Commission weapons inspectors. |
| 1284 | 17 December 1999 | 11-0-4 | Changed the Iraqi inspection program from UNSCOM to UNMOVIC. |
| 1441 | 8 November 2002 | Unanimous | Gave Iraq "a final opportunity to comply with its disarmament obligations". After Hans Blix of UNMOVIC reported to the UN on 7 March 2003, the US, UK, and other members of the "coalition of the willing" declared that Iraq remained in material breach of resolution 687. Efforts aimed at a new Council resolution authorizing the invasion were aborted owing to resistance from other members of the Council including veto-wielding members. Iraq was invaded anyway, on 20 March. |
| 1483 | 22 May 2003 | 14-0-0 | Recognized the US and the UK as occupying powers under international law, with legitimate authority in Iraq. Removed economic sanctions imposed during the Gulf War. Syria did not vote on the measure. |
| 1500 | 14 August 2003 | 14-0-1 | Created the United Nations Assistance Mission for Iraq as a special representative of the UN Secretary General. Extended by resolutions 1557, 1619, and 1700. Syria abstained. |
| 1546 | 8 June 2004 | Unanimous | Endorsed the dissolution of the Coalition Provisional Authority in favor of the Iraqi Interim Government as a step toward democracy. |
| 1723 | 18 November 2006 | Unanimous | Extended the mandate for Multinational Force Iraq until 31 December 2007. |
| 1790 | 18 December 2007 | Unanimous | Extended the mandate for Multinational Force Iraq until 31 December 2008. |
| 1830 | 7 August 2008 | Unanimous | Extended the mandate for United Nations Assistance Mission for Iraq until 7 August 2009. |
| 1859 | 22 December 2008 | Unanimous | Extended arrangements for the Development Fund for Iraq and the International Advisory and Monitoring Board until 31 December 2009. |
| 1883 | 7 August 2009 | Unanimous | Extended the mandate for United Nations Assistance Mission for Iraq until 7 August 2010. |
| 1905 | 21 December 2009 | Unanimous | Extended arrangements for the Development Fund for Iraq and the International Advisory and Monitoring Board until 31 December 2010. |
| 1936 | 5 August 2010 | Unanimous | Extended the mandate for United Nations Assistance Mission for Iraq until 31 July 2011, and urged Iraqi leaders to form a government as quickly as possible. |
| 1956 | 15 December 2010 | Unanimous | Extended arrangements a final time for the Development Fund for Iraq until 30 June 2011, and that 5% of proceeds from Iraqi oil sales would be deposited into the United Nations Compensation Commission following this. |
| 1957 | 15 December 2010 | Unanimous | Lifted sanctions relating to Weapons of Mass Destruction imposed under UNSCR 678 and UNSCR 707 |
| 1958 | 15 December 2010 | 14-0-1 | Terminated the Oil-for-Food Programme and established an escrow account to provide compensation to the United Nations for six years. |
| 2631 | 26 May 2022 | Unanimous | Extended the mandate for United Nations Assistance Mission for Iraq until 31 May 2023. |
| 2732 | 31 May 2024 | Unanimous | Agreed the transition and liquidation of the United Nations Assistance Mission for Iraq, by end of 2025. Expressed support for electoral processes, and stressed the importance of promoting Human Rights in Iraq. Highlighted Iraq's vulnerability to climate change. |
| 2792 | 17 September 2025 | Unanimous | Authorised the appointment of a Senior Representative with a mandate to promote, support and facilitate efforts to repatriate or return missing Kuwaiti and third country nationals and missing Kuwaiti property. |
