= United Nations Security Council Resolution 686 =

UN Security Council Resolution 686
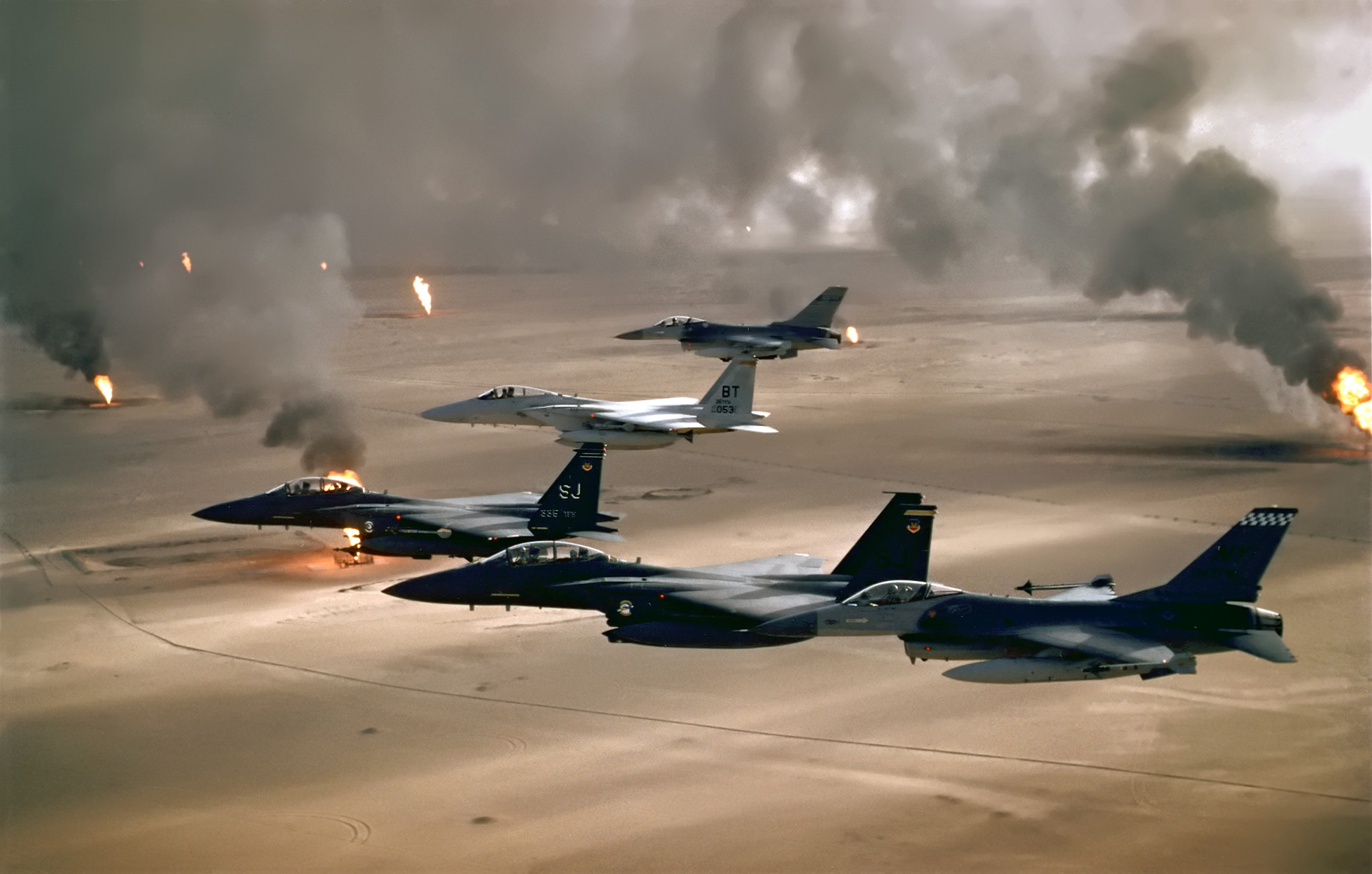
- USAF aircraft over burning Kuwaiti oil fields
- Date: 2 March 1991
- Meeting no.: 2,978
- Code: S/RES/686 (Document)
- Subject: Iraq–Kuwait
- Voting summary: 11 voted for; 1 voted against; 3 abstained
- Result: Adopted

Security Council composition
- Permanent members: China; France; Soviet Union; United Kingdom; United States
- Non-permanent members: Austria; Belgium; Côte d'Ivoire; Cuba; Ecuador; India; Romania; Yemen; Zaire; Zimbabwe

United Nations Security Council resolution 686 was adopted on 2 March 1991. After reaffirming resolutions 660, 661, 662, 664, 665, 666, 667, 669, 670, 674, 677 and 678 (all 1990), the council noted the suspension of international military action against Iraq and that all twelve previous resolutions continued to have full force and effect.

The resolution demanded that Iraq implement the twelve resolutions in full; rescind its actions regarding the annexation of Kuwait; accept liability under international law for all loss, damage or injury in Kuwait resulting from its invasion; release all Kuwaiti or foreign nationals, alive or deceased, it held; and return all property seized.

Resolution 686 also demanded that Iraq:

(a) end hostile and provocative actions by its forces against all Member States, including missile attacks;
(b) arrange for a ceasefire at the earliest possible time by designating military commanders to meet with its foreign counterparts;
(c) arrange for the release and immediate access to all prisoners of war under the auspices of the International Committee of the Red Cross;
(d) provide information identifying Iraqi mines, booby traps as well as any chemical and biological weapons in land or water.

It asked Iraq to inform the Secretary-General and Security Council when it has undertaken actions set out in the current resolution.

The Security Council also directed agencies of the United Nations, and requested other international organisations, to co-operate with the Government of Kuwait in the reconstruction of its country.

Resolution 686 was passed by 11 votes to 1 against (Cuba) with three abstentions from China, India, and Yemen.

Iraq later made concessions on 5 March relating the resolution, including the repeal of Iraqi laws and regulations in Kuwait.

== See also ==
- Gulf War
- Invasion of Kuwait
- Iraq–Kuwait relations
- List of United Nations Security Council Resolutions 601 to 700 (1987–1991)
