= Timeline of the Gulf War (1990–1991) =

Armed campaign between a United States-led coalition of 35 countries against Iraq

The timeline of the Gulf War details the dates of the major events of the 1990–1991 war. It began with the Iraqi invasion of Kuwait on 2 August 1990 and ended with the Liberation of Kuwait by Coalition forces. Iraq subsequently agreed to the United Nations' demands on 28 February 1991. The ground war officially concluded with the signing of the armistice on 11 April 1991. However, the official end to Operation Desert Storm did not occur until sometime between 1996 - 1998. Major events in the aftermath include anti-Saddam Hussein uprisings in Iraq, massacres against the Kurds by the regime, Iraq formally recognizing the sovereignty of Kuwait in 1994, and eventually ending its cooperation with the United Nations Special Commission in 1998.

== Prelude 1990 ==
- 28–30 May: Iraqi president Saddam Hussein says that oil overproduction by Kuwait and United Arab Emirates was an "economic warfare" against Iraq.
- 28 May: Hussein and Emir of Kuwait Jaber Al-Ahmad Al-Sabah meet at the Arab League Summit in Baghdad.
- 15 July: Iraq accuses Kuwait of stealing oil from the Rumaila oil field, an Iraqi oil field near the Iraqi-Kuwaiti border, and threatens military action in response.
- 22 July: Iraq begins deploying troops to the Iraqi-Kuwaiti border, creating a massive military buildup.
- 24 July: President of Egypt Hosni Mubarak travels to Baghdad to meet with Saddam Hussein and discuss the dispute between Kuwait and Iraq.

== 1990–1991 ==
=== 1990 ===
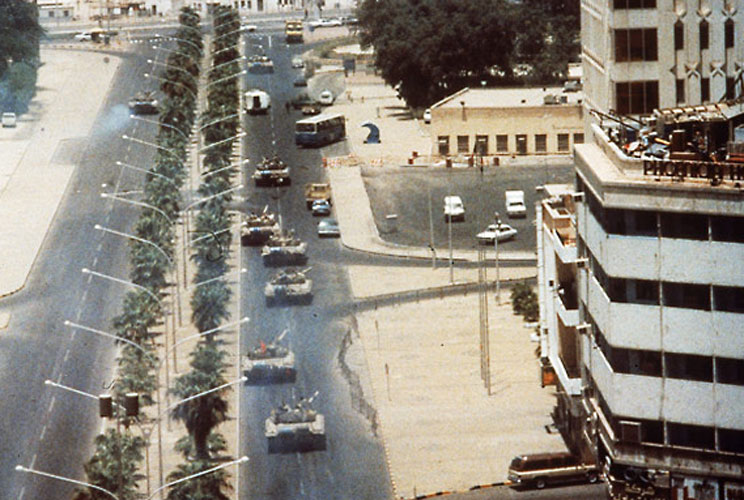
Iraqi T-72 tanks in Kuwait City.

- 2 August: About 100,000 Iraqi troops invade Kuwait.
- 2 August: Battle of Dasman Palace. Emir Jaber Al-Ahmad Al-Sabah flees to Saudi Arabia with his family and ministers.
- 2 August: United Nations Security Council (UNSC) Resolution 660 condemns the Iraqi invasion of Kuwait. Yemen is the only Arab country that does not take part in the vote in the UNSC.
- 3 August: President of the United States George H.W. Bush announces that U.S. Navy ships have been deployed to the Persian Gulf.
- 4 August: Alaa Hussein Ali is appointed Prime Minister of the Provisional Government of Free Kuwait and Ali Hassan al-Majid is appointed Governor of the Kuwait Governorate, which is declared the 19th Governorate of Iraq.
- 5 August: Emir Jaber Al-Ahmad Al-Sabah forms a government in exile in Ta'if, Saudi Arabia.
- 6 August: United Nations Security Council Resolution 661 implements international sanctions on Iraq. Yemen abstains from the vote in the UNSC.
- 6 August: United States Secretary of Defense Dick Cheney meets King Fahd of Saudi Arabia in Riyadh to discuss sending U.S. Armed Forces troops to defend Saudi Arabia in case of an Iraqi invasion.
- 7 August: 15,000 U.S. troops, 32 destroyers and 100 helicopters and fighter planes arrive in Saudi Arabia.
- 8 August: Operation Desert Shield is launched by the United States.
- 9 August: United Nations Security Council Resolution 662 condemns the Iraqi invasion of Kuwait.
- 9 August: Iraq closes all its land borders.
- 10 August: Arab League Emergency summit takes place in Cairo. The majority of Arab countries condemn the invasion and call on Iraq to withdraw its troops from Kuwait and reinstate Jaber Al-Ahmad Al-Sabah as Emir of Kuwait. Only Libya and the Palestine Liberation Organization support the Iraqi invasion.
- 10 August: Arab League Cairo summit votes, by a very small margin, to send Egyptian, Syrian and Moroccan military troops to the Gulf region to support Kuwait.
- 12 August: Naval blockade of Iraq begins.
- 13 August: Indian Government starts to airlift Indian nationals from Kuwait via Amman to Mumbai. About 175,000 Indian nationals are evacuated from Kuwait through 20 October.
- 15 August: Iran and Iraq re-establish diplomatic relations for the first time since the Iran–Iraq War.
- 16 August: Secretary Dick Cheney orders U.S. naval ships to stop all cargo and tankers leaving and entering Iraq and Kuwait.
- 18 August: United Nations Security Council Resolution 664 condemns Iraq and demands it leaves Kuwait.
- 19 August: United Arab Emirates allows foreign troops to enter its territory.
- 20 August: Hundred of thousands of Pakistani, Egyptian, Palestinian, and Filipino guest workers flee Kuwait to Jordan.
- 20 August: 82 British nationals are taken hostage in Kuwait.
- 25 August: United Nations Security Council Resolution 665 implements international sanctions on Iraq.
- 26 August: Iraq sieges foreign embassies in Kuwait City.
- 28 August: Kuwait formally annexed by Iraq.
- 29 August: United Nations Secretary-General Javier Pérez de Cuéllar travels to Baghdad to meet Foreign Minister of Iraq Tariq Aziz.
- 1 September: Iraq allows 700 Westerners, held hostage since the invasion, to leave Iraq.
- 2 September: Secretary-General Javier Pérez de Cuéllar returns from Baghdad without any agreement with the Government of Iraq.
- 9 September: President of the United States George H. W. Bush and President of the Soviet Union Mikhail Gorbachev meet in summit in Helsinki to discuss the Iraqi invasion. In a press conference, the presidents demand Iraq leave Kuwait under the UNSC Resolutions of 660, 661, 662, 664 and 665.
- 11 September: President George H. W. Bush in an address to a joint session of Congress issues conditions that Iraq must withdraw from Kuwait completely.
- 14 September: United Kingdom and France announce the deployment of troops to Saudi Arabia.
- 25 September: United Nations Security Council Resolution 661 implements civil aviation sanctions on Iraq.
- 17 October: 200,000 American, 15,000 British and 11,000 French troops are stationed in the Gulf region.
- 8 November: U.S. sends more troops to the Gulf region. About 100,000 troops arrive to support the existing 220,000 troops in the region.
- 19 November: Iraq sends about 200,000 more troops to Kuwait.
- 29 November: The U.N. Security Council passes Resolution 678, requiring Iraq to withdraw from Kuwait before January 15, 1991, or face military action.
- 29 November: President George H. W. Bush invites Foreign Minister of Iraq Tariq Aziz to meet in Washington D.C.
- 6 December: Iraq releases 3,000 foreign hostages from Kuwait and Iraq.
- 10 December: Iraq releases British hostages.

=== 1991 ===
- 9 January: United States Secretary of State James Baker meets Foreign Minister of Iraq Tariq Aziz at the Geneva Conference in Hotel InterContinental. No solution is reached.
- January 12: U.S. Congress passed a joint resolution authorizing the use of military force in Iraq and Kuwait. The votes were 52–47 in the U.S. Senate and 250–183 in the House of Representatives. These were the closest margins in authorizing force by the U.S. Congress since the War of 1812.
- 12 January: United Nations Secretary-General Javier Pérez de Cuéllar meets Saddam Hussein in Baghdad but does not reach an agreement with the Government of Iraq to withdraw from Kuwait.
- 12 January: Soviet special envoy Yevgeny Primakov meets with Saddam Hussein in Baghdad to discuss the possible Coalition invasion of Kuwait.
- 15 January: Saddam Hussein announces that Iraq will consider withdrawing its troops from Kuwait under some conditions.
- 15 January: 580,000 Coalition troops are stationed in the Gulf region, opposing 540,000 Iraqi troops.
- 15 January: First U.S. government statement relating to Operation Desert Storm is made.
- 15 January: Iraq ignores all UN resolutions.
- 16 January: Coalition forces led by the U.S. start deploying to Kuwait via the Persian Gulf and the Saudi Arabian border, triggering the first official infantry combat.
- 16 January: President George H. W. Bush addresses the nation from the Oval Office on the beginning of US-Led Coalition forces strikes at the beginning of Operation Desert Storm.
- 17 January: Foreign Minister of Iraq Tariq Aziz meets President of the Soviet Union Mikhail Gorbachev in Moscow where they discuss the Soviet peace plan.
- 17 January: Operation Desert Storm is launched and the first air attacks are launched on Iraq and Kuwait.
- 18 January, 01:00 GMT: Iraq fires 12 Scud missiles at the Israeli cities of Haifa and Tel Aviv, slightly injuring 12 people. The United States tells Israel to not retaliate, out of fear that it will escalate the war and trigger the collapse of the Arab Coalition. The U.S. deploys Patriot SAM systems to Israel and Saudi Arabia.
- 21 January: Foreign Minister of Iraq Tariq Aziz accepts the Soviet peace plan. President Bush refuses the peace plan as unrealistic for the coalition.
- 22 January: Iraq burns Kuwaiti oil fields. About 600 oil fields are on fire.
- 24 January: Iraq continues to burn Kuwaiti oil fields and dumps the oil into the Persian Gulf.
- 24 January: Coalition forces capture the small Kuwaiti island of Qaruh.
- 25 January: Iraqi troops dump millions of gallons of crude oil into the Persian Gulf.
- 29 January: United States and the Soviet Union offer a ceasefire to Iraq if it withdraws all its troops from Kuwait.
- 29 January: Iraqi forces invade the town of Khafji in Saudi Arabia. Iraqi forces are quickly engaged by Saudi Arabian and Qatari troops with help from the U.S. Marines.
- 30 January: Coalition starts its first land operations in Kuwait and Southern Iraq to liberate Khafji.
- 1 February: Iraqi forces are driven out of Saudi Arabia.
- 22 February: U.S. President George H. W. Bush issues a 24-hour ultimatum: Iraq must withdraw from Kuwait to avoid starting a ground war.
- 24 February: U.S.-led Coalition forces invade Iraq and Kuwait at around 4 a.m. Baghdad time. Special Air Service was the first to enter Iraqi territory.
- 25 February: 20,000 Iraqi troops surrender to the coalition. By the end of February, about 100,000 Iraqi troops will have surrendered.
- 25 February: Iraq launches Scud missile attacks on Dhahran in Saudi Arabia which kills 28 American troops and injures 98.
- 26 February: President of Iraq Saddam Hussein announces that Iraq will withdraw from Kuwait totally and accept the UN resolution. Saddam still does not renounce Iraqi claims over Kuwait.
- 26 February: Anywhere from 800 to 1,000 retreating Iraqi troops are killed when coalition aircraft bombed their stolen civilian and military vehicles. This becomes known as the Highway of Death.
- 26 February: Iraqi troops flee from Kuwait City.
- 27 February: U.S. Marines and Saudi Arabian troops enter Kuwait City.
- 27 February: 101st Airborne Division is less than 250 km from Baghdad over Highway 8.
- 27 February: President Bush announces that the Liberation of Kuwait has started and the cessation of hostilities will end that day at 04:00 GMT.
- 27 February: Coalition announces they have destroyed almost half of the all Iraqi divisions and 100,000 Iraqi troops have been taken as POWs.
- 28 February: President of the United States George H. W. Bush announces the ceasefire, declaring that Kuwait is free and the Iraqi Army is defeated.
- 28 February: Iraq announces that it will accept all UN resolutions.
- 1 March: Half of Saddam Hussein's Republican Guard tanks escape.
- 1 March: A cease-fire plan is negotiated in Safwan, Iraq.
- 1 March: Uprising (Shia rebellion) starts in Basra.
- 3 March: Iraq accepts the terms of a ceasefire from the U.N. Security Council.
- 13 March: United States Secretary of State James Baker meets President of Syria Hafez Al-Assad in Damascus to discuss future Middle East issues.
- 14 March: Anti-Saddam rebellions continue in Iraq.
- 15 March 1991: Emir returns to Kuwait
- 26 March: White House announces that Iraqi helicopters will not be shot down.
- 30 March: First Arab League summit since the Kuwaiti invasion starts in Cairo. An Iraqi delegation takes part in the summit.
- 3 April: Iraqi army massacres Kurds in Northern Iraq.
- 7 April: Kuwaiti Emir promises elections in Kuwait in 1992
- 11 April: Armistice is signed between the Coalition and Iraqi Army.
- 17 April: U.S. troops enter Northern Iraq from Turkey to protect Kurdish refugees.
- 21 April: General Schwarzkopf returns to the U.S.
- May: Bush extends pre-war economic sanctions "until Saddam Hussein is out of power".
- 15 June: 29 people are accused of co-operating with the Iraqi forces, and are executed in Kuwait.
- 16 August: UN repeals some Iraqi sanctions; Iraq is allowed to produce oil, limited to about USD$1.6 billion per barrel.
- 30 August: Kuwaiti Air Force attacks Iraqi destroyer in the Persian Gulf.
- 7 November: The final Kuwaiti oil fire is extinguished.

== Aftermath ==
=== 1992 ===
- 26: August: No-fly zone is established in Southern Iraq.

=== 1993 ===
- 26 June: United States bombs Iraq.

=== 1994 ===
- 10 November: Iraq recognizes Kuwaiti independence and acknowledge their shared border.

=== 1995 ===
- 14 April: United Nations Security Council approves the Oil-for-Food Programme to Iraq.

=== 1996 ===
- 3 September: United States bombs Iraq and extends the No-fly zone in Southern Iraq.

=== 1998 ===
- 31 October: Iraq ends its co-operation with the United Nations Special Commission.
- 16-19 December 1998: United States bombs Iraq
