= Highway of Death =

Road in Iraq

Highway of Death incident
- Part of the Gulf War
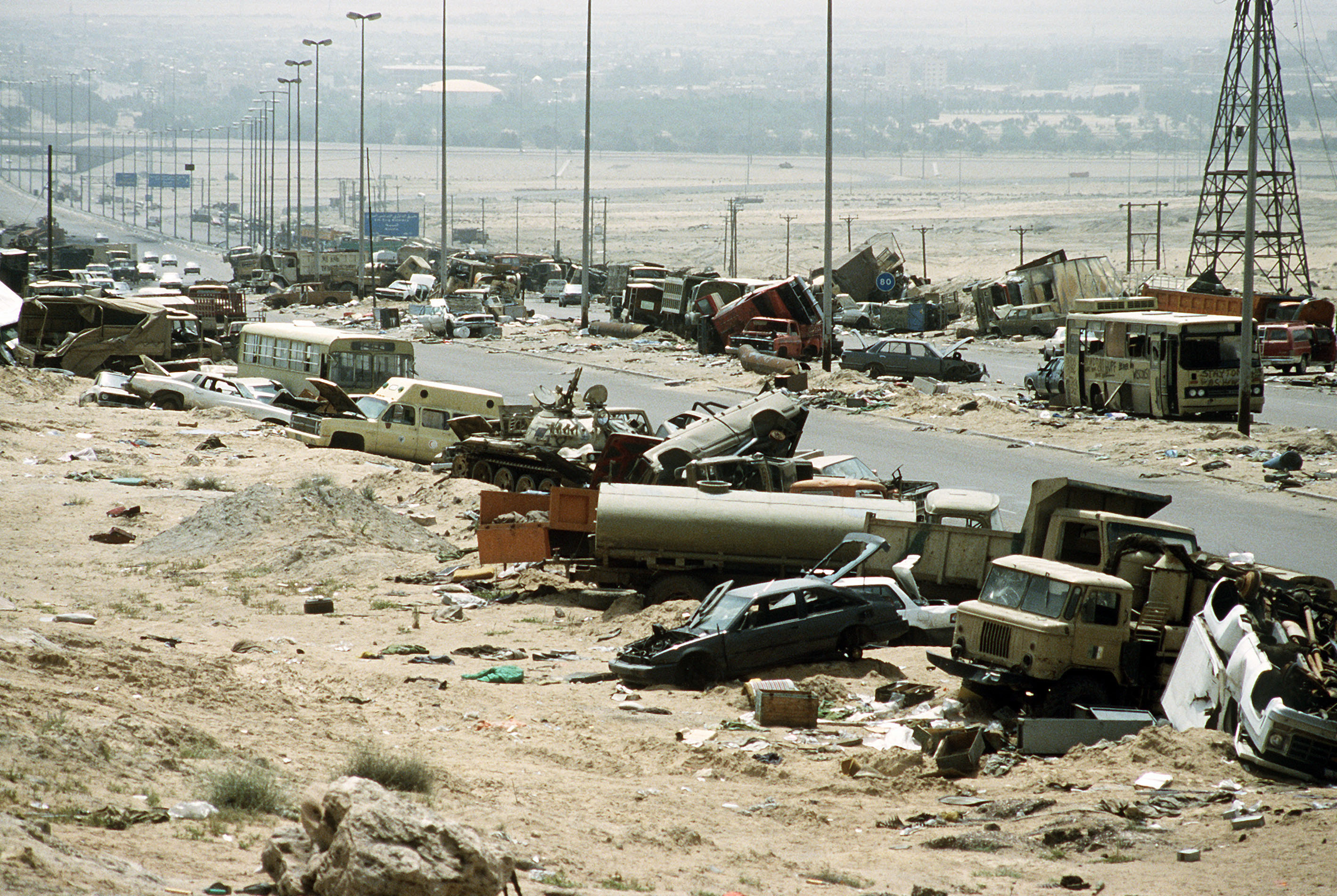
- Wrecked and abandoned vehicles along Highway 80 in April 1991
Date	February 25–27, 1991
Location	Highway 80, a major road out of Kuwait City towards Basra, Iraq 29°23′03″N 47°39′06″E

Belligerents
United States; United Kingdom; Canada; France	Iraq

Commanders and leaders
(United States) Norman Schwarzkopf	No Centralized Leadership

Casualties and losses
None	200–1,000+ killed; 2,000 captured; 1,800–2,700 vehicles destroyed or abandoned

The Highway of Death (Arabic: طريق الموت ṭarīq al-mawt) is a six-lane highway connecting Kuwait and Iraq, officially known as Highway 80. It runs from Kuwait City to the border town of Safwan in Iraq and then on to the Iraqi city of Basra. The road was used by Iraqi armored divisions for the 1990 invasion of Kuwait. It was repaired after the Gulf War and used by U.S. and British forces in the initial stages of the 2003 invasion of Iraq.

During the American-led Coalition offensive in the Persian Gulf War, American, Canadian, British, and French aircraft and ground forces attacked retreating Iraqi military personnel attempting to leave Kuwait on the night of February 26–27, 1991, resulting in the destruction of hundreds of vehicles and the deaths of many of their occupants. Between 1,400 and 2,000 vehicles were hit or abandoned on the main Highway 80 north of Al Jahra.

The scenes of devastation on the road are some of the most recognizable images of the war, and it has been suggested that they were a factor in President George H. W. Bush's decision to declare a cessation of hostilities the next day. Many Iraqi soldiers successfully escaped across the Euphrates river, and the U.S. Defense Intelligence Agency estimated that upwards of 70,000 to 80,000 troops from defeated divisions in Kuwait might have fled into Basra, evading capture.

== Highway 80 ==
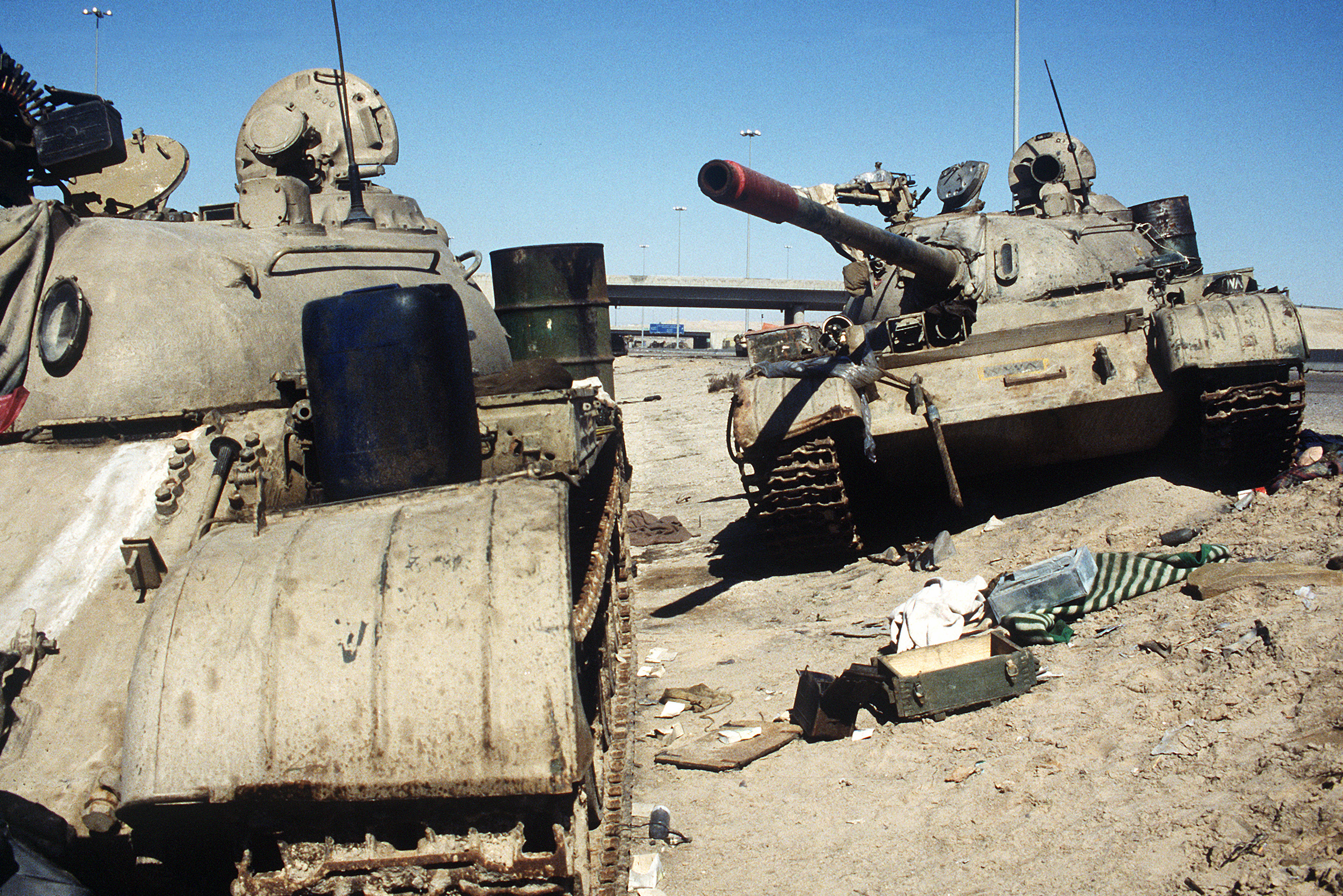
Two Iraqi T-54/55 tanks lie abandoned near Kuwait City on February 26, 1991

The attack began on February 26 when A-6 Intruder attack jets of the United States Marine Corps' 3rd Marine Aircraft Wing blocked the head and tail of the column on Highway 80, bombarding a massive vehicle column of mostly Iraqi Regular Army forces with Mk 20 Rockeye II cluster bombs, effectively boxing in the Iraqi forces in an enormous traffic jam and thereby setting up targets for subsequent airstrikes. Over the next ten hours, scores of U.S. Marine, U.S. Air Force and U.S. Navy aircraft from USS Ranger (CV/CVA-61) attacked the convoy using a variety of weapons. Vehicles surviving the air attacks were later engaged by arriving coalition ground units, while most of the vehicles that managed to evade the traffic jam and continued to drive on the road north were targeted individually. The road bottle-neck near the Mutla Ridge police station was reduced to a long uninterrupted line of more than 300 stuck and abandoned vehicles sometimes called the Mile of Death. The wreckage found on the highway consisted of at least 28 tanks and other armored vehicles with many more commandeered civilian cars and buses filled with stolen Kuwaiti property.

The death toll from the attack remains unknown. British journalist Robert Fisk said he "lost count of the Iraqi corpses crammed into the smoldering wreckage or slumped face down in the sand" at the main site and saw hundreds of corpses strewn up the road all the way to the Iraqi border. American journalist Bob Drogin reported seeing "scores" of dead soldiers "in and around the vehicles, mangled and bloated in the drifting desert sands." A 2003 study by the Project on Defense Alternatives (PDA) estimated fewer than 10,000 people rode in the cut-off main caravan, and when the bombing started most simply left their vehicles to escape through the desert or into the nearby swamps where some died from their wounds and some were later taken prisoner. According to PDA, while the often repeated estimate of the numbers of 200-300 killed in the attack, originally reported in The Washington Post by Michael Kelly, fits roughly with the reported observations of journalists on the ground, a minimum death toll of at least 500–600 seems more plausible.

In 1993, The Washington Post interviewed an Iraqi survivor of the attacks:

There were hundreds of cars destroyed, soldiers screaming. [...] It was nighttime as the bombs fell, lighting up charred cars, bodies on the side of the road and soldiers sprawled on the ground, hit by cluster bombs as they tried to escape from their vehicles. I saw hundreds of soldiers like this, but my main target was to reach Basra. We arrived on foot.

== Highway 8 ==
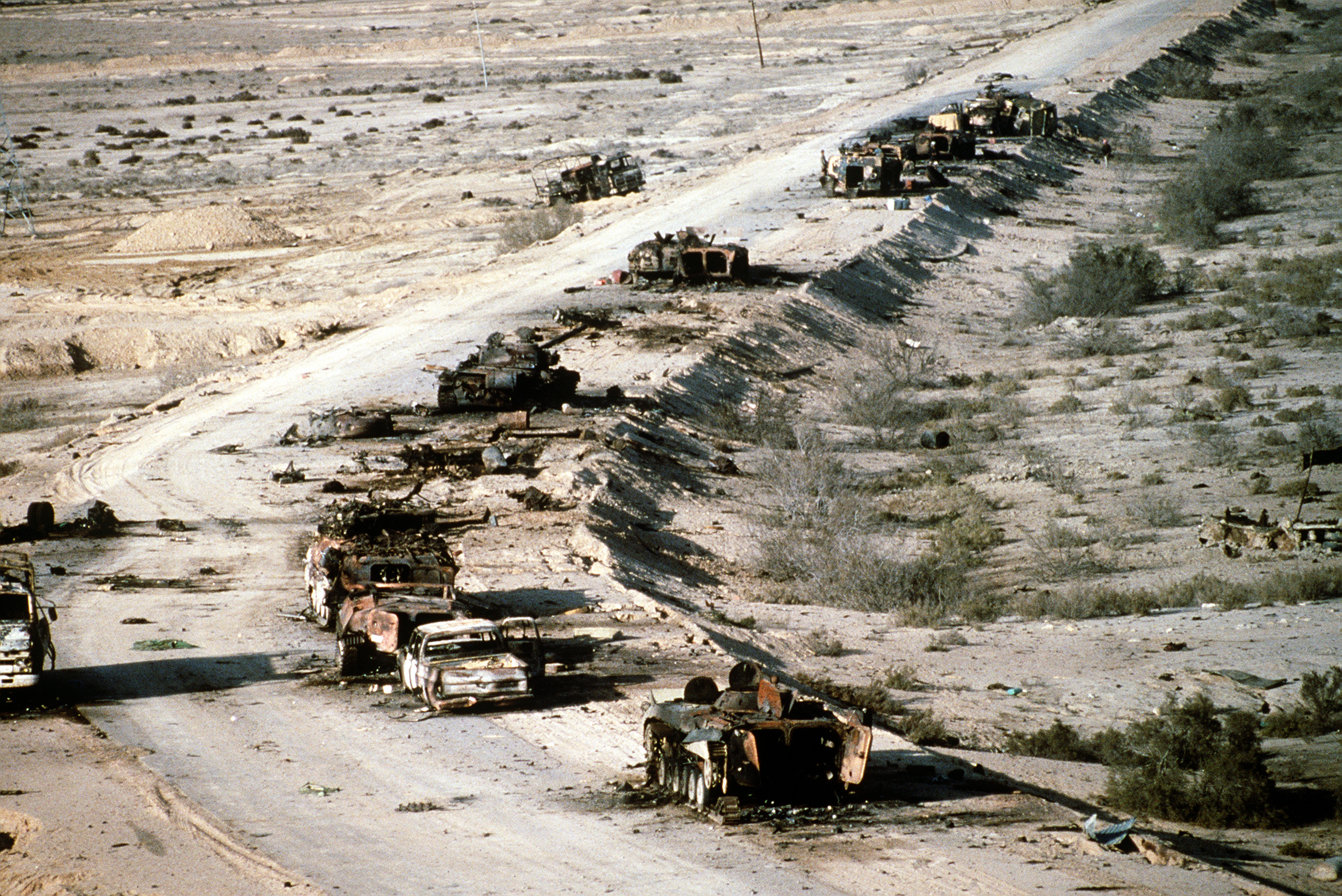
Aerial view of a destroyed Iraqi column consisting of a T-72 tank, several BMP-1 and Type 63 armoured vehicles, and trucks on Highway 8 in March 1991

Iraqi forces including the elite Iraqi Republican Guard's 1st Armored Division Hammurabi were trying to either redeploy or escape on and near Highway 8, the continuation of Highway 80 in Iraq. They were engaged over a much larger area in smaller groups by U.S. artillery units and a battalion of AH-64 Apache attack helicopters operating under the command of General Barry McCaffrey. Hundreds of predominantly military Iraqi vehicles grouped in defensive formations of approximately a dozen vehicles were then systematically destroyed along a 50-mile stretch of the highway and nearby desert.

PDA estimated the number killed there to be in the range of 300–400 or more, bringing the likely total number of fatalities along both highways to at least 800 or 1,000. A large column composed of remnants of the Hammurabi Division attempting to withdraw to safety in Baghdad were also engaged and obliterated deep inside Iraqi territory by Gen. McCaffrey's forces a few days later on March 2, in a post-war "turkey shoot"-style incident known as Battle of Rumaila.

== Controversies ==
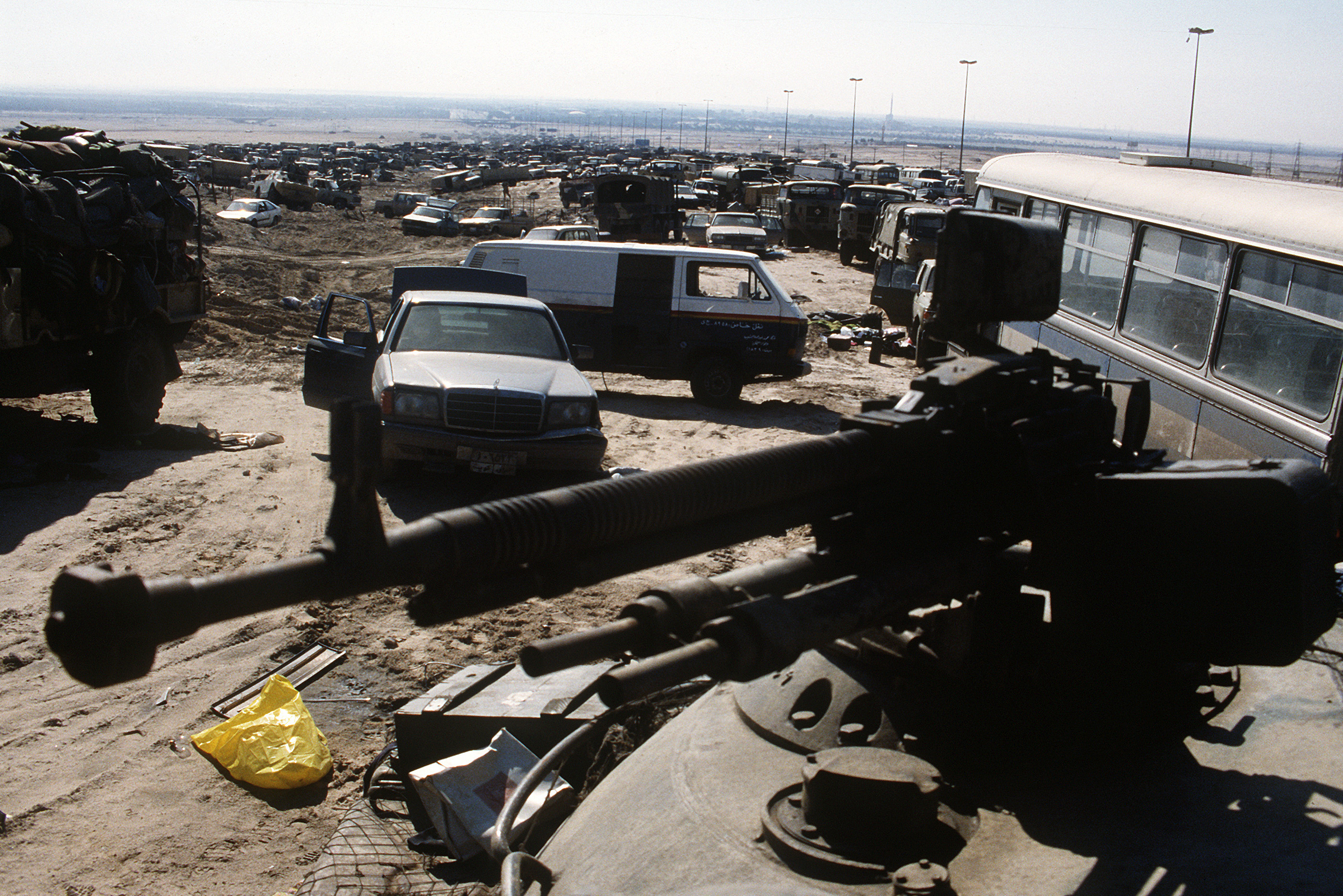
Abandoned vehicles clog the Basra–Kuwait highway out of Kuwait City after the retreat of Iraqi forces. A view from top of an Iraqi tank on February 26, 1991. The car in the centre is a Mercedes-Benz W126 S-class with an Iraqi occupation license plate.

Controversy rose on the destruction of the Iraqi forces in the Highway of Death. Commentators argued that the destruction of the retreating Iraqi units was a disproportionate use of force, saying that they were retreating from Kuwait in compliance with UN Resolution 660 which was passed 2 August 1990. It had been followed by UN Resolutions 661, 662, 664, 665, 666, 667, 669, 670, 674, and 677 continuing the UN's demands that Iraq retreat for Kuwait before UN Resolution 678 authorized UN member states to use "all necessary means" to remove Iraqi forces from Kuwait.

Other criticisms levied were that the column included Kuwaiti hostages and civilian refugees with the latter reported to have included women and children family members of pro-Iraqi, PLO-aligned Palestinian militants and Kuwaiti collaborators who had fled shortly before the returning Kuwaiti authorities pressured nearly 200,000 Palestinians to leave Kuwait.

Activist and former United States Attorney General Ramsey Clark argued that the attacks violated the Third Geneva Convention, Article 3, which prohibits killing soldiers placed 'hors de combat' (out of combat) due to sickness, wounds, detention, or any other cause. However other commentators point out that under current international law retreating is explicitly a military action and thus retreating soldiers are not out of combat. "Geneva Protocol I Article 41.2 defines 'hors de combat' as a person who is "in the power of an adverse Party", is expressing an intention to surrender, or is incapacitated; however it explicitly includes that hostile acts or attempting to escape (i.e. retreat) removes this protected status.

Additionally, journalist Seymour Hersh, citing American witnesses, alleged that a platoon of U.S. Bradley Fighting Vehicles from the 1st Brigade, 24th Infantry Division opened fire on a large group of more than 350 disarmed Iraqi soldiers who had surrendered at a makeshift military checkpoint after fleeing the devastation on Highway 8 on February 27, apparently killing several soldiers. The U.S. Military Intelligence personnel who were manning the checkpoint claimed they too were fired on from the same vehicles and barely fled by car during the incident. Journalist Georgie Anne Geyer criticized Hersh's article, saying that he offered "no real proof at all that such charges—which were aired, investigated and then dismissed by the military after the war—are true."

Before the U.S. Military Police were deployed to guard the wreckage, looting of functional Iraqi weapons took place.

Coalition leader General Norman Schwarzkopf stated in 1995:

The first reason why we bombed the highway coming north out of Kuwait is because there was a great deal of military equipment on that highway, and I had given orders to all my commanders that I wanted every piece of Iraqi equipment that we possibly could destroy. Secondly, this was not a bunch of innocent people just trying to make their way back across the border to Iraq. This was a bunch of rapists, murderers and thugs who had raped and pillaged downtown Kuwait City and now were trying to get out of the country before they were caught.

According to the Foreign Policy Research Institute, however, "appearances were deceiving":

Postwar studies found that most of the wrecks on the Basra roadway had been abandoned by Iraqis before being strafed and that actual enemy casualties were low. Further, opinion surveys showed that American support for the war was largely unaffected by the images. (Arab and Muslim public opinion was, of course, another matter, about which Powell may have been rightly concerned.)

Photojournalist Peter Turnley published photographs of mass burials at the scene. Turnley wrote:

I flew from my home in Paris to Riyadh when the ground war began and arrived at the "mile of death" very early in the morning on the day the war stopped. Few other journalists were there when I arrived at this incredible scene, with carnage that was strewn all over. On this mile stretch were cars and trucks with wheels still turning and radios still playing. Bodies were scattered along the road. Many have asked how many people died during the war with Iraq, and the question has never been well answered. That first morning, I saw and photographed a U.S. military "graves detail" burying many bodies in large graves. I don't recall seeing many television images of these human consequences. Nor do I remember many photographs of these casualties being published.

Time magazine commented:

The pictures were among the most stunning to come out of the gulf war: mile after mile of burned, smashed, shattered vehicles of every description—tanks, armored cars, trucks, autos, even stolen Kuwaiti fire trucks—littering the highway from Kuwait City to Basra. To some Americans, the pictures were also sickening. [...] After the war, correspondents did find some cars and trucks with burned bodies, but also many vehicles that had been abandoned. Their occupants had fled on foot, and the American planes often did not fire at them.

== In popular culture ==
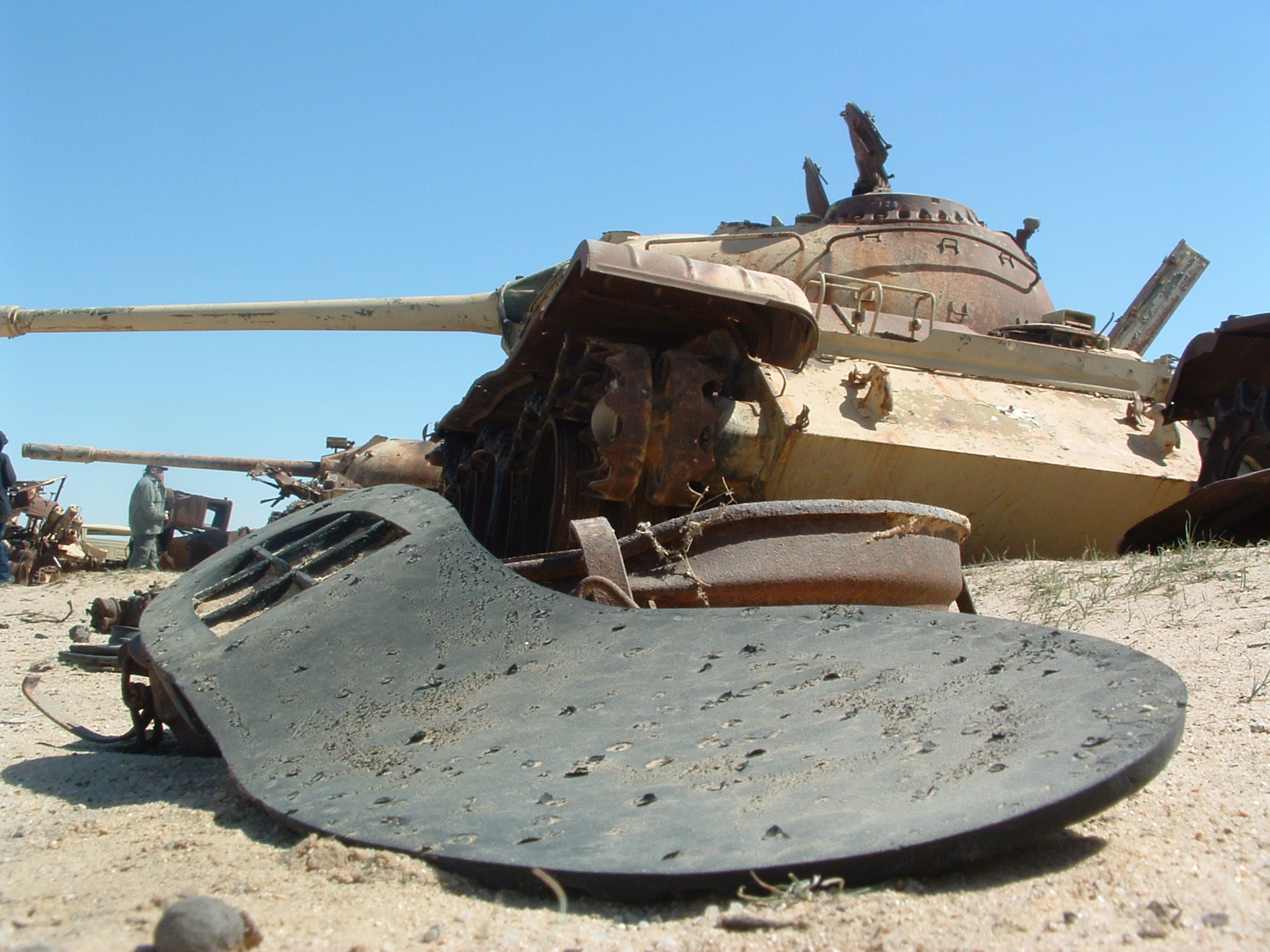
A shoe sole and rusting Iraqi tanks lie along the Highway of Death in 2003

- In 1991, The Guardian commissioned British anti-war poet Tony Harrison to commemorate the war, and in particular the Highway of Death. His poem, A Cold Coming, began with an ekphrastic representation of a graphic photograph taken on Highway 8 by photojournalist Kenneth Jarecke.
- The 1992 song "Hero" by the industrial metal band Ministry directly mentions the Highway of Death at the end of its first verse.
- Iain Banks's 1993 novel Complicity has chapter 12 (of 13) called "Basra Road" and uses the imagery, although not the phrase.
- Galician band Siniestro Total recorded 'Autopista de Basora' for their 1993 album Made in Japan.
- The 2005 film Jarhead contains a scene in which a group of U.S. Marines pass through the Highway of Death.
- The 2010 video game Tom Clancy's Splinter Cell: Conviction features a level where the player controls a Navy Seal fighting through the Highway of Death.
- In the 2019 video game Call of Duty: Modern Warfare, a fictional depiction of a similar event in the fictional middle-eastern country of Urzikstan is named the Highway of Death, with the attack carried out by Russian forces. The depiction led to criticism, including accusations of historical revisionism.
- The 2023 film Hidden Strike involves the characters driving on the Highway of Death.

== See also ==
- Roads in Kuwait
- Battle of the Junkyard
- Death Road (Todesgang)
- Hell's Highway (disambiguation)
- Raate Road
- Operation Mersad
- Battle of Fallujah (2016) – At the end of this battle, U.S. and Iraqi forces performed a similar large-scale bombing campaign against retreating ISIL militants
