= United Nations Security Council Resolution 687 =

UN Security Council Resolution 687
- Iraq (green) and Kuwait (orange)
- Date: 3 April 1991
- Meeting no.: 2,981
- Code: S/RES/687 (Document)
- Subject: Iraq–Kuwait
- Voting summary: 12 voted for; 1 voted against; 2 abstained
- Result: Adopted

Security Council composition
- Permanent members: China; France; Soviet Union; United Kingdom; United States
- Non-permanent members: Austria; Belgium; Côte d'Ivoire; Cuba; Ecuador; India; Romania; Yemen; Zaire; Zimbabwe

United Nations Security Council Resolution 687 was adopted on 3 April 1991. After reaffirming resolutions 660, 661, 662, 664, 665, 666, 667, 669, 670, 674, 677, 678 (all 1990) and 686 (1991), the Council set the terms, in a comprehensive resolution, with which Iraq was to comply after losing the Gulf War. Resolution 687 was passed by 12 votes to one (Cuba) against, with two abstentions from Ecuador and Yemen, after a very extended meeting. Iraq accepted the provisions of the resolution on 6 April 1991.

== Details ==
Resolution 687, divided into nine sections, firstly urged Iraq and Kuwait to respect the boundary between the two countries, calling on the Secretary-General Javier Pérez de Cuéllar to assist in demarcating the border. It requested the Secretary-General to submit, within one month, a plan for the deployment of the United Nations Iraq–Kuwait Observation Mission along the demilitarized zone which was established to be 10 km into Iraq and 5 km into Kuwait.

=== Weapons of Mass Destruction ===
The Council reminded Iraq of its obligations under the Geneva Protocol and to unconditionally remove and destroy all chemical and biological weapons and ballistic missiles with a range greater than 150 km. As part of this demand, the Council requested Iraq submit, within 15 days, a report declaring all locations of all the aforementioned weapons and agree to urgent, on-site inspections. It then established the United Nations Special Commission relating to inspections and set provisions for it, and asked Iraq to abide by its obligations under the Treaty on the Non-Proliferation of Nuclear Weapons, agreeing not to develop nuclear weapons and submitting a report to the Secretary-General and International Atomic Energy Agency within 15 days. The resolution noted that these actions "represent steps towards the goal of establishing in the Middle East a zone free from weapons of mass destruction and all missiles for their delivery and the objective of a global ban on chemical weapons".

After discussing the facilitation of repatriations of prisoners of war and co-operation with the International Committee of the Red Cross, the Council required Iraq to inform the Council that it did not commit to or support terrorism and would not allow such acts to take place in its territory.

=== Iraq liability for Kuwaiti losses ===
Resolution 687 then referred to repatriations and compensation, stating Iraq is liable for any loss, damage, and injury inflicted upon Kuwait, further demanding that Iraq hand over any remaining property seized from Kuwait. It also declared null and void any statements by Iraq regarding its refusal to repay its foreign debt, and decided to create a fund for these compensation claims (the United Nations Compensation Commission, officially established in Resolution 692).

=== Review of sanctions against Iraq ===
Regarding sanctions, the Council reiterated international sanctions against Iraq do not apply to foodstuffs or medical aid to the civilian populations of Iraq and Kuwait, as well as removing sanctions placed on Iraq in Resolution 661 (1990) and decided to review these restrictions every 60 days. However, sales of weapons and other related material to Iraq will continue to be prohibited.

== Effects ==
Upon Iraq's acceptance of all paragraphs of the resolution, a formal ceasefire began between Iraq and Kuwait and Member States co-operating with Kuwait.

=== Use of resolution for American attacks ===
The most important part of the resolution was the concluding paragraph 34, which required that "[the Security Council]...[d]ecides...to take such further steps as may be required for the implementation of the present resolution and to secure peace and security in the area." This paragraph, and similar provisions in Resolution 678, were used by the United States and United Kingdom as legal justification for their 1996 bombing of Iraq, 1998 bombing of Iraq, and 2003 invasion of Iraq, with officials claiming the resolutions provided authority to "use all necessary means" to compel Iraq to comply with its UN obligations. This reasoning was heavily criticized at the time by numerous experts in international law, and later called into question by the UK's own public inquiry into the Iraq war.

== See also ==
- Gulf War
- Invasion of Kuwait
- Iraq and weapons of mass destruction
- Iraq–Kuwait relations
- List of United Nations Security Council Resolutions 601 to 700 (1987–1991)
