= United Nations Security Council Resolution 678 =

1990 resolution on removal of Iraq from Kuwait by "all necessary means"

UN Security Council Resolution 678
- Iraq (green) and Kuwait (orange)
- Date: 29 November 1990
- Meeting no.: 2,963
- Code: S/RES/678 (Document)
- Subject: Iraq–Kuwait
- Voting summary: 12 voted for; 2 voted against; 1 abstained
- Result: Adopted

Security Council composition
- Permanent members: China; France; Soviet Union; United Kingdom; United States
- Non-permanent members: Canada; Colombia; Ivory Coast; Cuba; Ethiopia; Finland; Malaysia; Romania; Yemen; Zaire

United Nations Security Council Resolution 678 was adopted on 29 November 1990. After reaffirming resolutions 660, 661, 662, 664, 665, 666, 667, 669, 670, 674 and 677 (all 1990), the council noted that despite all the United Nations efforts, Iraq continued to defy the Security Council.

== Details ==
The Security Council, invoking Chapter VII of the United Nations Charter, offered Iraq one final chance to implement Resolution 660 (1990) which demanded that Iraq withdraw its forces unconditionally from Kuwait and return them to the positions in which they were located on 1 August 1990, the day before the invasion of Kuwait began.

Before the vote, United States lobbied states which had membership of the council at the time, including the Soviet Union, China, Malaysia and Yemen, to support a resolution authorizing UN members states to use "all necessary means" for removing Iraqi forces from Kuwait. China, which had usually vetoed such resolutions authorizing action against a state, abstained in exchange for a promise from the US government that sanctions would be eased, and that the Chinese foreign minister would be received in the White House. States were offered economic incentives for 'yes' votes, and those who initially opposed the resolution were discouraged from voting 'no' by the threat of economic sanctions, particularly from the United States. The US successfully obtained a commitment from the Saudi government to provide $1 billion to the Soviets in aid through the winter.

On 29 November 1990, the Security Council passed Resolution 678 under the guidance of Canada, the USSR, United Kingdom and the United States, which gave Iraq until 15 January 1991 to withdraw from Kuwait and empowered states to use "all necessary means" to force Iraq out of Kuwait after the deadline. The Resolution requested Member States to keep the council informed on their decisions. This later became the legal authorization for the Gulf War, as Iraq did not withdraw by the deadline.

Resolution 678 was adopted by 12 votes with two opposing (Cuba and Yemen) and one abstention (China).

Cuba had voted for or abstained on previous resolutions relating to the Iraqi invasion, but did not support Resolution 678 because of its authorization of "all necessary means."

After Yemen voted against the resolution, the US, World Bank and International Monetary Fund halted aid programs to Yemen, and Saudi Arabia expelled Yemeni workers. US diplomats told Yemeni officials it "was the most expensive no vote you ever cast"—referring to ceasing more than $70 million of US government foreign aid to Yemen.

== Criticism ==
Burns Weston, a professor of international law at the University of Iowa, argued that Resolution 678 set a "dubious precedent" by backing away from the "peaceful and humanitarian purposes and principles" enshrined in the United Nations Charter. Weston said it did this by failing to vest in the UN the responsibility and accountability for the military force that was deployed to the region, but instead allowing the United States to manage it.

== See also ==
- Gulf War
- Iraq–Kuwait relations
- List of United Nations Security Council Resolutions 601 to 700 (1987–1991)
