= United Nations Security Council Resolution 700 =

UN Security Council Resolution 700
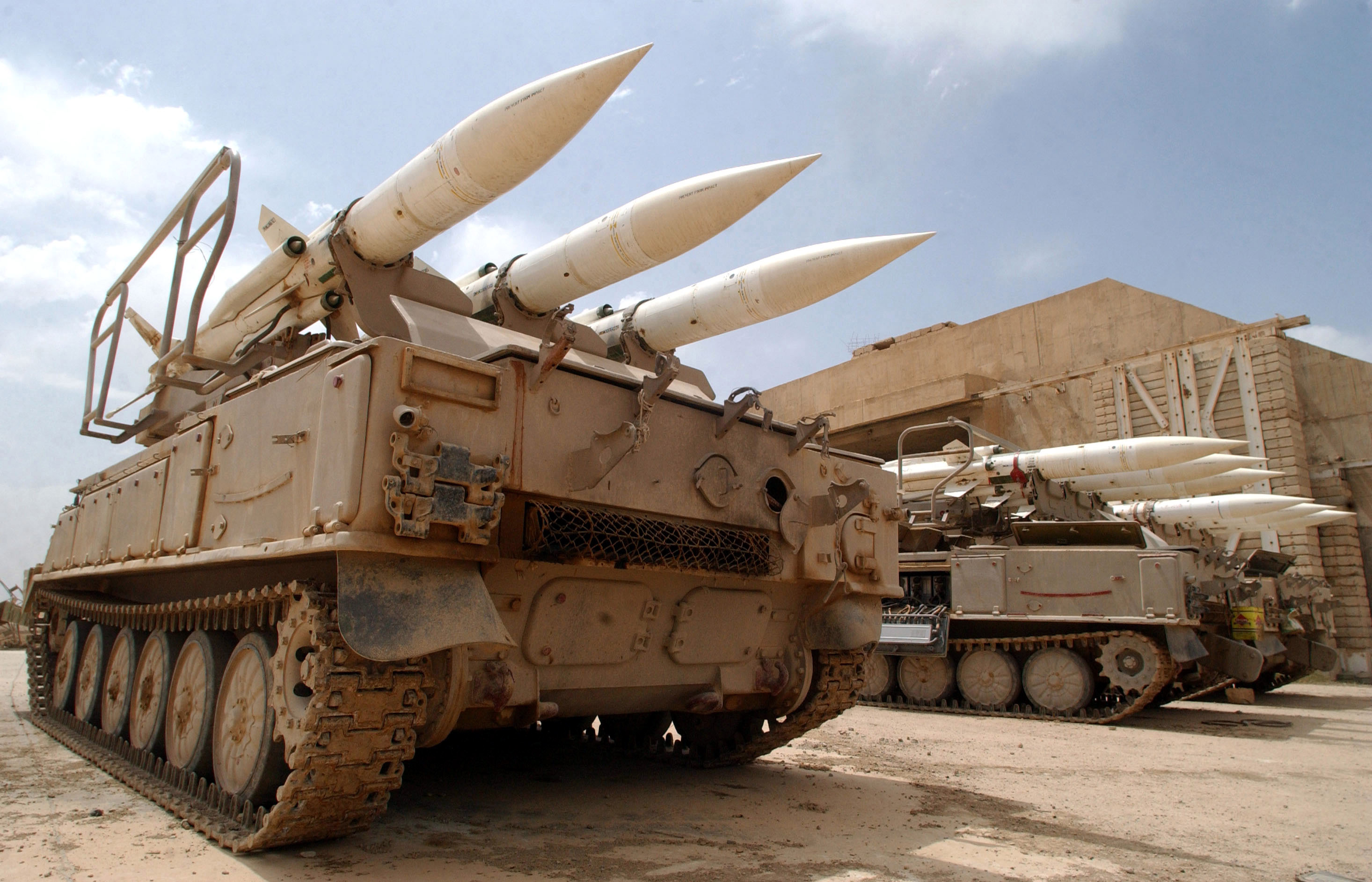
- Soviet-made Iraqi tanks (2003)
- Date: 17 June 1991
- Meeting no.: 2,994
- Code: S/RES/700 (Document)
- Subject: Iraq
- Voting summary: 15 voted for; None voted against; None abstained
- Result: Adopted

Security Council composition
- Permanent members: China; France; Soviet Union; United Kingdom; United States
- Non-permanent members: Austria; Belgium; Côte d'Ivoire; Cuba; Ecuador; India; Romania; Yemen; Zaire; Zimbabwe

United Nations Security Council resolution 700, adopted unanimously on 17 June 1991, after recalling resolutions 661 (1991), 665 (1991), 670 (1991) and 687 (1991), and noting the report by the Secretary-General it requested, the council, acting under Chapter VII, the Council approved the full implementation of Resolution 687–the arms embargo against Iraq.

The Council called on all states and international organisations to strictly implement the embargo, requesting states to report within 45 days on the measures they have taken the implementation. It also entrusted the Security Council Committee established in Resolution 661 (1990) to monitor the prohibitions against the sale or supply of arms to Iraq and related sanctions. The committee would submit five reports, at 90 days intervals, to the council on the implementation of the resolution.

== See also ==
- Gulf War
- Iraq and weapons of mass destruction
- Iraq disarmament timeline 1990–2003
- Iraq–Kuwait relations
- Sanctions against Iraq
- List of United Nations Security Council Resolutions 601 to 700 (1987–1991)
