= United Nations Security Council Resolution 674 =

UN Security Council Resolution 674
- Iraq (green) and Kuwait (orange)
- Date: 29 October 1990
- Meeting no.: 2,951
- Code: S/RES/674 (Document)
- Subject: Iraq–Kuwait
- Voting summary: 13 voted for; None voted against; 2 abstained
- Result: Adopted

Security Council composition
- Permanent members: China; France; Soviet Union; United Kingdom; United States
- Non-permanent members: Canada; Colombia; Côte d'Ivoire; Cuba; Ethiopia; Finland; Malaysia; Romania; Yemen; Zaire

United Nations Security Council resolution 674, adopted on 29 October 1990, after recalling resolutions 660 (1990), 661 (1990), 662 (1990), 664 (1990), 665 (1990), 666 (1990), 667 (1990) and 670 (1990) on the topic of Iraq, the council condemned the continuing situation in occupied Kuwait after the Iraqi invasion on 2 August 1990, reaffirming the goal of the international community of maintaining international peace and security.

== Details ==
The resolution firstly demanded that Iraqi forces cease and desist from taking foreign nationals hostage, as well as the mistreatment of Kuwaiti nationals, in violation of decisions of the council, the Fourth Geneva Convention and international law, inviting states to collect information of violations against them and making this information available to the council. It also demanded Iraq fulfill its obligations under the Vienna Convention on Diplomatic Relations and Consular Relations, after the diplomatic missions of some countries were entered by Iraqi forces, and requested Iraq to allow foreign nationals and diplomatic officials to leave. The council further requested Iraq to rescind its removal of diplomatic immunity and the closure of embassies in occupied Kuwait.

Regarding humanitarian issues, Resolution 674 asserted that Iraq should ensure access to food, water and basic services to the civilian population of Kuwait, as well as to foreign nationals and diplomatic staff. The council reminded Iraq that it is liable for any loss, damage or injury following the invasion concerning Kuwait and third states, and those of their nationals and corporations. At the same, the resolution asked Member States to collect information on relevant claims for restitution and compensation.

Noting that the council will be seized of the matter until Kuwait achieves its independence again, the council requested the Secretary-General Javier Pérez de Cuéllar, "using his good offices", to continue to undertake diplomatic efforts in order to reach a peaceful solution to the crisis, reporting back on developments.

Resolution 674 was the tenth resolution adopted on the conflict, threatening "further measures" if necessary. It was the most comprehensive resolution on the conflict regarding humanitarian issues, and was adopted by 13 votes to none, with two abstentions from Cuba and Yemen.

== See also ==
- Foreign relations of Iraq
- Gulf War
- Invasion of Kuwait
- Iraq–Kuwait relations
- List of United Nations Security Council Resolutions 601 to 700 (1987–1991)
