= United Nations Security Council Resolution 949 =

UN Security Council Resolution 949
- Iraq (green) and Kuwait (orange)
- Date: 15 October 1994
- Meeting no.: 3,438
- Code: S/RES/949 (Document)
- Subject: Iraq–Kuwait
- Voting summary: 15 voted for; None voted against; None abstained
- Result: Adopted

Security Council composition
- Permanent members: China; France; Russia; United Kingdom; United States
- Non-permanent members: Argentina; Brazil; Czech Republic; Djibouti; New Zealand; Nigeria; Oman; Pakistan; Rwanda; Spain

United Nations Security Council resolution 949, adopted unanimously on 15 October 1994, after recalling previous resolutions including 678 (1990), 686 (1991), 687 (1991), 689 (1991) and 833 (1993) on Iraq, the council, acting under Chapter VII of the United Nations Charter, demanded that Iraq withdraw troops recently deployed to the border with Kuwait or face further measures.

The council noted past Iraqi threats and use of force against neighbouring countries, and that any such threats or provocative actions constitute a threat to regional peace and security. It was determined to prevent Iraq from resorting to threats and intimidation of nearby countries and the United Nations, and diplomatic efforts were welcomed. The Council underlined that Iraq was responsible for consequences of any failure to implement the current resolution.

It was noted that Iraq had affirmed its readiness to resolve the issue of Kuwait's sovereignty in a positive manner but urged Iraq to respect Kuwait's territorial integrity, sovereignty and borders as required in resolutions 687 and 833. Recent Iraqi military deployments near the Kuwaiti border were condemned, with the resolution demanding that all troops deployed in southern Iraq withdraw immediately. It also demanded that such actions would not happen again and for Iraq to co-operate with the United Nations Special Commission.

The following day after the adoption of Resolution 949, Iraq began withdrawing its forces.

== See also ==
- Gulf War
- Invasion of Kuwait
- Kuwait–Iraq barrier
- List of United Nations Security Council Resolutions 901 to 1000 (1994–1995)
- Operation Vigilant Warrior
