= United Nations Security Council Resolution 670 =

UN Security Council Resolution 670
- Iraq (green) and Kuwait (orange)
- Date: 25 September 1990
- Meeting no.: 2,943
- Code: S/RES/670 (Document)
- Subject: Iraq–Kuwait
- Voting summary: 14 voted for; 1 voted against; None abstained
- Result: Adopted

Security Council composition
- Permanent members: China; France; Soviet Union; United Kingdom; United States
- Non-permanent members: Canada; Colombia; Côte d'Ivoire; Cuba; Ethiopia; Finland; Malaysia; Romania; Yemen; Zaire

United Nations Security Council resolution 670, adopted on 25 September 1990, related to the situation arising out of Iraq's invasion of Kuwait on 2 August 1990.

After recalling resolutions 660 (1990), 661 (1990), 662 (1990), 664 (1990), 665 (1990), 666 (1990) and 667 (1990) on the topic of Iraq, the Security Council condemned the continued Iraqi occupation of Kuwait, the violence against Kuwaiti citizens and its defiance of Security Council resolutions. It also noted the expulsion of Iraqi diplomats from several countries. As a consequence, the Council decided to impose further sanctions on Iraq, relating to civil aviation.

Acting under Chapter VII of the United Nations Charter, the council went on to call on all member states to strictly enforce international sanctions against Iraq, confirming that sanctions imposed in Resolution 661 (1990) also apply to aircraft, deciding that:

(a) Member States should deny permission of aircraft to take off from their territory if it should take cargo to or from Iraq and occupied Kuwait, excluding medical and humanitarian aid, and resources for the United Nations Iran–Iraq Military Observer Group;
(b) Member States should deny permission to any aircraft destined for Iraq or Kuwait to overfly its territory, unless approved by the Security Council Committee, via inspection that it is not in violation of Resolution 661, or is certified for use by the Military Observer Group;
(c) Member States should take necessary measures that all its aircraft comply with Resolution 661 and co-operate with one another in doing so;
(d) Member States should detain Iraqi ships entering their ports, unless for humanitarian purposes so as to safeguard human life.

It also reminded countries that, under Resolution 661 (1990), to continue to freeze Iraqi assets while protecting those of the "legitimate government of Kuwait" and sanctioning Iraqi diplomats. Additionally, the Council called upon all Member States to co-operate with the Security Council Committee in providing information regarding the action taken by them to implement the provisions from the current resolution.

Finally, the Council warned that any state evading Resolution 661 (1990) may have measures taken against it, while also reminding Iraq of its obligations under the Fourth Geneva Convention.

Resolution 670, the ninth to condemn Iraq for its invasion of Kuwait, was approved by 14 votes to one vote against, from Cuba, and no abstentions.

== See also ==
- Foreign relations of Iraq
- Gulf War
- Invasion of Kuwait
- Iraq–Kuwait relations
- Sanctions against Iraq
- List of United Nations Security Council Resolutions 601 to 700 (1987–1991)
