= Highway 8 (Iraq) =

Road in Iraq

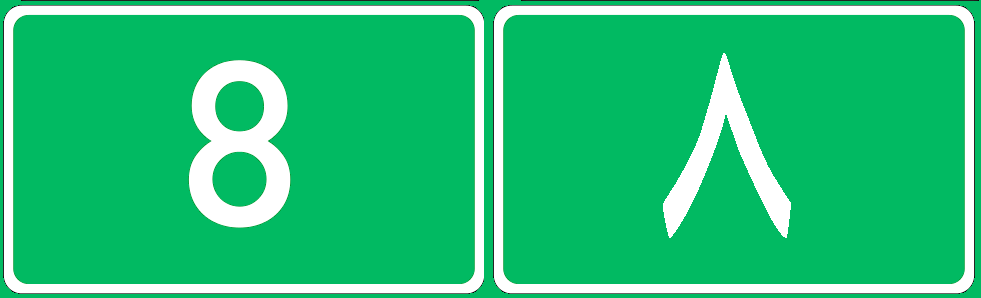
Highway 8
- ٨ طريق رقم

Route information
- Part of

Major junctions
- From: Baghdad
- To: Safwan; Kuwaiti Highway 80

Location
- Country: Iraq

Highway system
- Highways in Iraq

Highway 8 is an Iraqi highway which extends from Baghdad, through Al Hillah, Al-Qādisiyyah, As Samawah, Nasiriyah, Basrah, to the Kuwait frontier.
