= Geneva Peace Conference (1991) =

1991 failed attempt between Iraq and the U.S. to prevent the Gulf War

The Geneva Peace Conference was held on January 9, 1991, in Geneva, Switzerland, to find a peaceful solution to the Iraqi occupation of Kuwait in order to avoid a war between Ba'athist Iraq and the United States-backed coalition. Iraqi Foreign Minister Tariq Aziz represented Iraq, while U.S. Secretary of State James Baker was the United States representative. Lasting nearly seven hours, both parties refused to move on their initial positions. Iraq refused to withdraw from Kuwait, while the United States and its allies continued to demand Iraq's immediate withdrawal. The meeting was the final initiative that eventually led to the Gulf War.

== Build-up ==
On November 29, 1990, the United Nations Security Council passed Resolution 678, which authorized member states 'to use all necessary means to uphold and implement all previous resolutions demanding the immediate withdrawal of Iraq from Kuwait.' The goal of the resolution was to give Saddam Hussein one last firm message that the United Nations would not allow Iraq to continue its occupation of Kuwait. Even its close ally and former enemy of the United States, the Soviet Union, tried to convince Saddam to reconsider his actions. Soviet general secretary Mikhail Gorbachev tried to persuade Saddam to look out for his own and Iraq's best interests. He was successful in having fellow United Nations member states include a 'period of goodwill' within Resolution 678. The period of goodwill was designed to give Iraq an opportunity to review its policy and actions and hopefully come to the conclusion that it would be best to withdraw.

In the United States, President George H. W. Bush insisted on going an "extra mile for peace". This initiative allowed the opportunity for open dialogue between Iraq and the United States. The U.S. position included the option of receiving Foreign Minister Tariq Aziz and sending Secretary of State Baker to Iraq. The main goal behind this policy was to assure American voters that the US government was taking steps to avoid a military conflict with Iraq.

Iraq welcomed the opportunity for direct talks with the U.S. From the beginning of the Kuwait invasion, Saddam had lobbied for direct negotiations with the United States. Iraq had been previously denied any face-to-face negotiations. Iraq's Information Minister, Latif Nusseit Jasim, stated that Iraq was willing to discuss "every aspect of the crisis of the [Persian] Gulf, without exception, so long as the Americans were prepared to negotiate without any preconditions."

Other Arab dictatorships called for Saddam to comply with Resolution 678. Egyptian President Muhammad Hosni Mubarak and Saudi King Fahd, along with other heads of state, publicly called for an unconditioned withdrawal from Kuwait. Syrian Minister of Defense Mustafa Tlas stated that Syria would increase its military if Iraq did not comply. After a meeting in Cairo on December 3, 1990, Saudi Arabia, Syria, and Egypt issued a statement that stated "Bush's initiative creates the last chance for removing the danger of war from the region. Saddam had better seize this opportune moment to withdraw from Kuwait, rather than embroil the region in a bloody and futile war.

When trying to decide on a date for Iraqi and U.S. personnel to meet, Saddam insisted on a date close to the January 15 deadline of Resolution 678. His goal was to try to evade the United Nations resolution. The United States wanted the date to be between December 20, 1990, and January 3, 1991, in order to give Saddam enough time to withdraw the Iraqi army. The closer to the resolution deadline, the more flexibility Saddam would have. It would be unrealistic to withdraw a large number of troops within a few days. While Saddam continued to hold out for a meeting closer to the deadline of Resolution 678, President Bush reluctantly offered that the meeting be held in Geneva, Switzerland, on January 9, 1991. It was finally agreed that Tariq Aziz and James Baker would meet to discuss the occupation of Kuwait and the United Nations Resolutions. President Bush had promised the United States Congress that no resolution would be presented to it until after the Geneva meeting.

== Iraq's position ==
On January 9, 1991, Tariq Aziz was scheduled to meet James Baker. For publicity reasons, Iraq insisted that Aziz and Baker walk into the room together and sit at the same time. The two men also shook hands for a photo. Aziz smiled, while Baker refrained from showing any emotion. Aziz was accompanied by Barzan al-Takriti, Ambassador to the United Nations and Saddam's half-brother, and Saddam's personal interpreter. Throughout the meeting Aziz spoke in Arabic, even though he could speak English. He did this to make sure his Iraqi colleagues could fully understand him.

Aziz came into the meeting with little leverage. Saddam had instructed him on the Iraqi position, and he had little flexibility to deviate from it. The Iraqi position had been throughout the crisis that Iraq would not consider withdrawing from Kuwait, unless the Palestinian issue was resolved. Aziz tried to turn any potential military conflict with the United States and its allies into a war between Iraq and the United States. When confronted with the possibility of fighting other Arab countries, Aziz stated,

But when a war breaks out between an Arab and Muslim country on the one hand, and foreign powers such as the United States, Britain, and other foreign nations, on the other, combatants will not keep in mind that they will be fighting to vindicate UN resolutions.... The soldier in our region does not fight only when ordered to do so. Indeed he fights out of convictions.... Against the backdrop of your ties with Israel, I would like to tell you in all sincerity that if you initiate military action against an Arab country, you will be faced with hostile sentiment in the region, and in many Muslim states as well.

No change was made in the Iraqi position, besides an offer extended for Baker to visit Baghdad. Again, Aziz referred to the Palestinian issue, citing that it was a double standard if Iraq was forced to withdraw and Israel could still occupy Palestinian land. Aziz said, "We truly believe that the failure to resolve the Palestinian question will pose threats to Iraq's security." His idea of a settlement is laid out in his statement to Baker,

I would like to tell you in all sincerity and seriousness that we would have no problems implementing legitimacy and the rules of justice and fairness if these principles were to be honored with regard to all regional conflicts. Such a thing would promote our interests and realize our aspirations…However, we do not want to see these principles implemented with regard to a single issue... this would mean that double standards were at work.... If you are willing to work to achieve peace, justice, stability, and security in the while region, then you would find us at the forefront of those willing to co-operate with you in this regard.

== The United States and its allies' position ==
President Bush wanted to convey the message that the United States and its allies would not agree to anything less than a full withdrawal of Kuwait. He stated this in a letter he wrote directly to Saddam. The goal of this letter was to clarify and make sure Saddam fully understood the consequences his actions would have. President Bush's letter was not designed to threaten, but to inform Saddam that the United States and its allies would implement Resolution 678 and use all means necessary to do so.

Throughout the meeting, James Baker was flanked by Robert Kimmitt, Under Secretary of State for Political Affairs, Dennis Ross, Director of the State Department Policy Planning Staff, and John Kelly, Assistant Secretary Of State for Near Eastern and South Asian Affairs. After sitting down with Tariq Aziz, Baker handed him President Bush's letter. After reading it Aziz refused to accept it on the count that it is full of threats and includes language that is not normally used in dialogue between heads of state. There was speculation at the time that Baker would deliver a letter to Saddam, and Aziz had told Saddam that if the letter was not cordial and objective that he would return it to Baker. Baker reiterated that the coalition would not move from its position of a complete withdrawal. Arab leaders had been in touch with President Bush and informed him that the United States prior to the meeting that they should not accept a partial withdrawal, only a full withdrawal would be acceptable.

Throughout the meeting, Baker emphasized the full capabilities of the U.S. military and warned him that it held a technological advantage over Iraq. Baker also brought up one of the major concerns of the coalition, weapons of mass destruction. They feared Saddam might use chemical or biological weapons against the United States, because Saddam had previously used chemical weapons on Iran and his own people. Baker gave Aziz a firm warning, "If the conflict starts, God forbid, and chemical or biological weapons are used against our forces, the American people would demand revenge, and we have the means to implement this. This is not a threat, but a pledge that if there is any use of such weapons, our objective would not be only the liberation of Kuwait, but also the toppling of the present regime. Any person who is responsible for the use of these weapons would be held accountable in the future." This warning was meant to communicate that the United States had the option to retaliate with nuclear weapons on Iraq, if any chemical or biological weapons were used on its troops. James Baker made sure that Tariq Aziz fully understood this concept, because the United States feared any use of weapons of mass destruction.

== Outcome ==
The Geneva meeting resulted in no significant progress toward a resolution to the Iraqi occupation of Kuwait. Tariq Aziz had little power to change Iraq's position and was required to uphold Saddam's initial position. Saddam used the conference for propaganda purposes within Iraq, while the United States used the meeting to show the world it was serious about resolving the crisis without military action and to notify Saddam what would happen if he failed to remove the Iraqi army from Kuwait. The meeting set the stage for what would eventually be known as the Gulf War or Operation Desert Storm. Arab countries persisted in their position that the United States should implement Resolution 678 and offer its economic, political, and military support in executing all the resolutions regarding the occupation of Kuwait.

After the meeting Aziz explained to the media that Iraq wanted a peaceful resolution to the problems of the region, but it could not just be about the occupation of Kuwait, that it must include the occupation of Gaza, the West Bank, and the Golan Heights. Baker's reaction after the meeting was that Iraq was unwilling to uphold the United Nations resolutions and that it was willing to continue its current occupation of Kuwait. Baker had little hope that anything other than military action would remove Iraq from Kuwait. Although little was accomplished in the meeting, it was a historic meeting in which both countries met face-to-face. Both countries held strong to their positions, and it gave the world one last hope of a peaceful solution.

== See also ==
- List of Middle East peace proposals
