= United Nations Security Council Resolution 667 =

UN Security Council Resolution 667
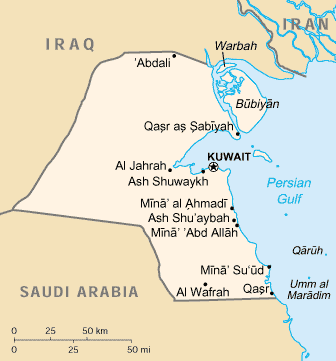
- Kuwait
- Date: 16 September 1990
- Meeting no.: 2,940
- Code: S/RES/667 (Document)
- Subject: Iraq–Kuwait
- Voting summary: 15 voted for; None voted against; None abstained
- Result: Adopted

Security Council composition
- Permanent members: China; France; Soviet Union; United Kingdom; United States
- Non-permanent members: Canada; Colombia; Côte d'Ivoire; Cuba; Ethiopia; Finland; Malaysia; Romania; Yemen; Zaire

United Nations Security Council resolution 667, adopted unanimously on 16 September 1990, related to the situation after Iraq's invasion of Kuwait on 2 August 1990. After recalling its resolutions 660 (1990), 661 (1990), 664 (1990), 665 (1990) and 666 (1990), the Security Council expressed its outrage and condemned "aggressive acts" by Iraq against diplomatic missions and personnel in occupied Kuwait, including the abduction of some, in violation of the Vienna Convention on Diplomatic Relations and Consular Relations.

Iraqi soldiers entered the diplomatic missions of some European and Arab nations, abducting several personnel and expelling others. Acting under Chapter VII of the United Nations Charter, the Council demanded the immediate release of foreign nationals as well as all nationals mentioned in Resolution 664, reminding it of its international obligations according to the Vienna Conventions. It also asked Iraq to protect the safety and well-being of diplomatic and consular staff and premises in Kuwait, and to take no action that would hinder their diplomatic functions, including access for their nationals to the premises.

Finally, the resolution urged all Member States to strictly observe all resolutions passed against Iraq, deciding to take further actions against the country for its defiance of Security Council resolutions and of international law.

The passing of resolution 667 galvanised world opinion into support for extreme force to counter Saddam Hussein's actions. Iraq's Deputy Representative to the United Nations, Sabah Talat Kadrat, denounced the resolution in a textbook case of Whataboutism, saying the Council took rapid action against his country but had taken none with regard to Israeli–Palestinian conflict.

== See also ==
- Foreign relations of Iraq
- Gulf War
- Invasion of Kuwait
- Iraq–Kuwait relations
- List of United Nations Security Council Resolutions 601 to 700 (1987–1991)
