= United Nations Security Council Resolution 677 =

UN Security Council Resolution 677
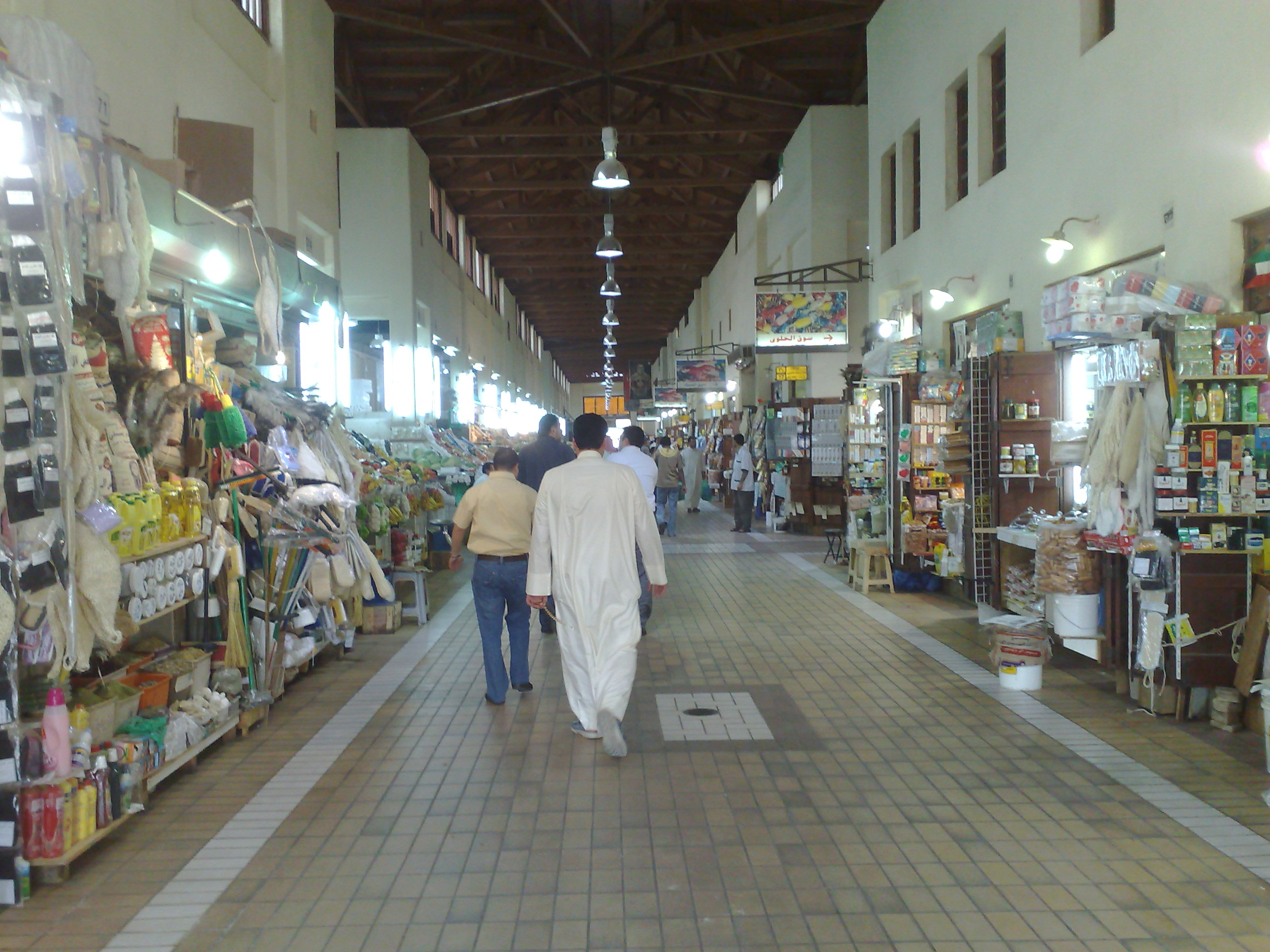
- Kuwaiti civilians
- Date: 28 November 1990
- Meeting no.: 2,962
- Code: S/RES/677 (Document)
- Subject: Iraq–Kuwait
- Voting summary: 15 voted for; None voted against; None abstained
- Result: Adopted

Security Council composition
- Permanent members: China; France; Soviet Union; United Kingdom; United States
- Non-permanent members: Canada; Colombia; Côte d'Ivoire; Cuba; Ethiopia; Finland; Malaysia; Romania; Yemen; Zaire

United Nations Security Council resolution 677, adopted unanimously on 28 November 1990, after recalling resolutions 660 (1990), 662 (1990) and 674 (1990), the Council condemned attempts by Iraq to alter the demographic composition of Kuwait and the restrictions on the movement of its citizens.

Acting under Chapter VII of the United Nations Charter, the Council also condemned attempts by Iraq to destroy civil records maintained by the Government of Kuwait. Therefore, the resolution mandated the Secretary-General Javier Pérez de Cuéllar to take custody of a population register of Kuwait that has been certified by the "legitimate Government of Kuwait" and which covers the population register until 1 August 1990. It also asked the Secretary-General and the Kuwaiti government to establish a set of rules and regulations governing access to the register.

The resolution was adopted in anticipation of the disappearance of Kuwaitis or the influx of non-Kuwaitis as a result of Iraqi policy in the occupied country.

== See also ==
- Foreign relations of Iraq
- Gulf War
- Invasion of Kuwait
- Iraq–Kuwait relations
- List of United Nations Security Council Resolutions 601 to 700 (1987–1991)
