= Filipinos in Kuwait =

Total population
- 400,000 in 2024

Languages
- Languages of the Philippines, English and Arabic

Religion
- Roman Catholicism or other Christian denominations, Islam

Related ethnic groups
- Filipino people, Overseas Filipinos

Filipinos in Kuwait are either migrants from or descendants of the Philippines living in Kuwait. As of 2020, there are roughly 241,000 of these Filipinos in Kuwait. Most people in the Filipino community are migrant workers, and approximately 60% of Filipinos in Kuwait are employed as domestic workers.

== Overseas employment ==
In 2016, Kuwait was the sixth-largest destination of Overseas Filipino workers, with 90,000 hired or rehired in the nation in 2011, and accordingly Kuwait has been an important source of remittances back to the Philippines, with over $105 million USD being remitted in 2009. Nine Filipino banks have correspondent accounts with banks in Kuwait to allow for remittance transfers.

There is a Filipino Worker's Resource Center (FWRC) located in Jabriya, and it provides refuge for Filipino workers in Kuwait who have "[experienced] various forms of maltreatment from their employers such as fatigue, non-payment of salaries," as well as "lack of food [and] physical, verbal and sexual abuse". Through assistance from the FWRC, the Philippine Embassy in Kuwait, the Philippine Overseas Employment Administration, and Overseas Workers' Welfare Administration, hundreds of Filipinos in Kuwait have been repatriated to the Philippines due to these issues.

Filipino domestic servants in Kuwait are the most expensive overseas servants that can be hired, due to a minimum wage requirement by the Filipino government as well as high costs from recruitment agencies. Minimum monthly wage of a Filipino maid is KWD 110 per month (US$365), with an initial recruitment cost of KWD 850 (US$2825), with the price varying based on previous experience.

== Society and culture ==
Kuwait had the largest number of voters registered under the Overseas Absentee Voting Act eligible to vote in the 2013 Philippine general election. Philippine holidays such as Independence Day, commemorating the Philippine Declaration of Independence, are celebrated in Kuwait. Religious events, such as the Catholic festivities honoring Our Lady of Peñafrancia as well as the Muslim holiday Eid al-Adha are celebrated by their respective Filipino Catholic and Filipino Muslim communities.

== See also ==
- Kuwait–Philippines relations
- Philippine diaspora
- Immigration to Kuwait
