= United Nations Security Council Resolution 669 =

UN Security Council Resolution 669
- Iraq (green) and Kuwait (orange)
- Date: 24 September 1990
- Meeting no.: 2,942
- Code: S/RES/669 (Document)
- Subject: Iraq–Kuwait
- Voting summary: 15 voted for; None voted against; None abstained
- Result: Adopted

Security Council composition
- Permanent members: China; France; Soviet Union; United Kingdom; United States
- Non-permanent members: Canada; Colombia; Côte d'Ivoire; Cuba; Ethiopia; Finland; Malaysia; Romania; Yemen; Zaire

United Nations Security Council resolution 669, adopted unanimously on 24 September 1990, related to the proposed punitive measures against Iraq following its invasion of Kuwait on 2 August 1990.

After recalling Resolution 661 (1990) and Article 50 of Chapter VII of the United Nations Charter, the Security Council acknowledged the increasing number of requests for assistance having been received under Article 50, relating to international sanctions against Iraq after its invasion of Kuwait.

Article 50 states that if the Security Council is enforcing sanctions against any state, whether it be a Member of the United Nations or not, a country that is confronted with economic problems as a result of the measures has the right to consult the council to find a solution to the problem. 21 states, including Jordan, which were experiencing adverse consequences of the sanctions, filed requests in this manner.

In this regard, the council requested the Security Council Committee established in Resolution 661 (1990) to examine requests for assistance under Article 50. It reported back by asking Member States to support other states that had been affected by the sanctions on Iraq.

== See also ==
- Foreign relations of Iraq
- Gulf War
- Invasion of Kuwait
- Iraq–Kuwait relations
- List of United Nations Security Council Resolutions 601 to 700 (1987–1991)
