= United Nations Security Council Resolution 666 =

UN Security Council Resolution 666
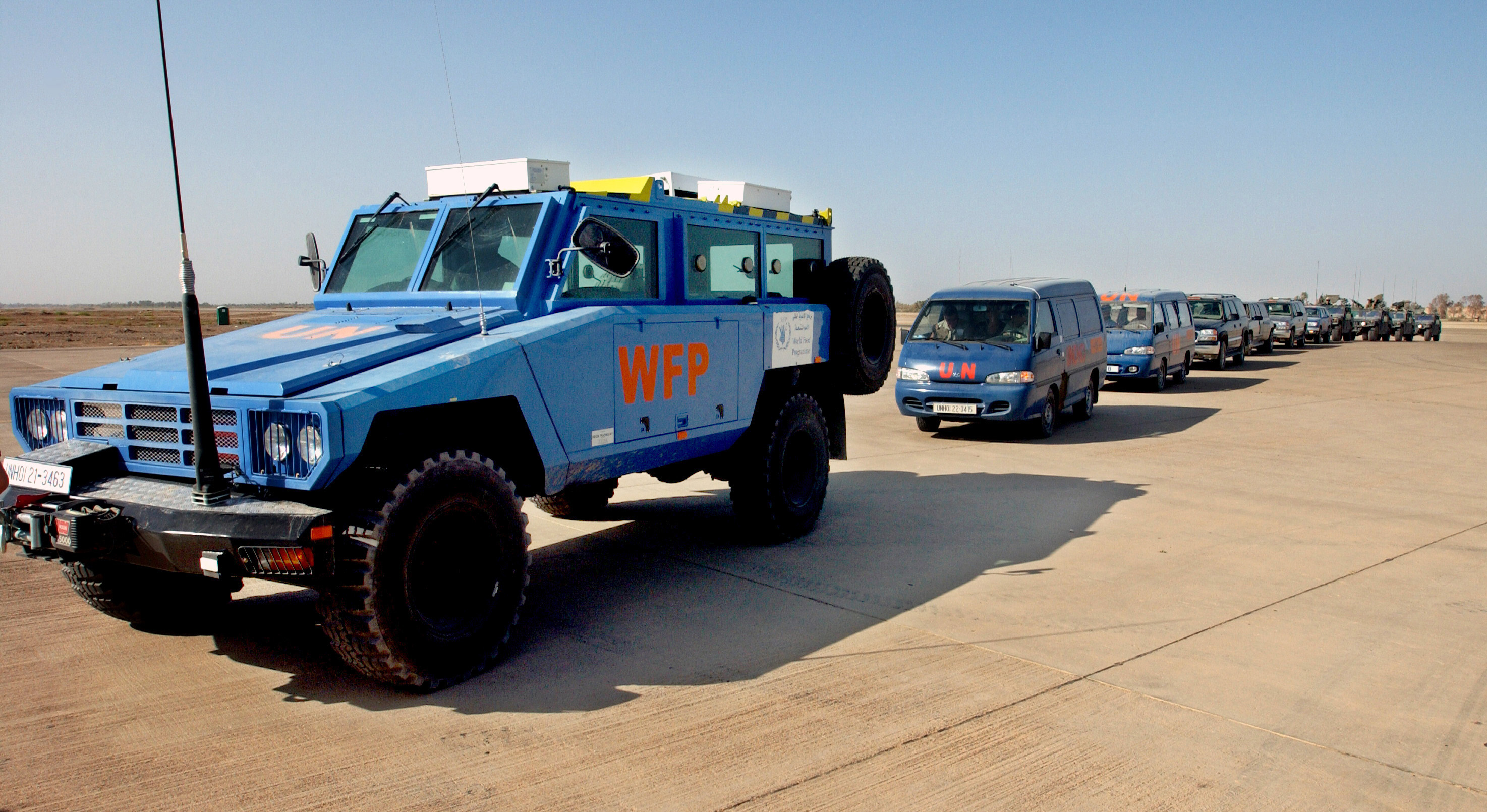
- World Food Programme convoy
- Date: 13 September 1990
- Meeting no.: 2,939
- Code: S/RES/666 (Document)
- Subject: Iraq–Kuwait
- Voting summary: 13 voted for; 2 voted against; None abstained
- Result: Adopted

Security Council composition
- Permanent members: China; France; Soviet Union; United Kingdom; United States
- Non-permanent members: Canada; Colombia; Côte d'Ivoire; Cuba; Ethiopia; Finland; Malaysia; Romania; Yemen; Zaire

In United Nations Security Council Resolution 666, adopted on September 13, 1990, after recalling resolutions 661 (1990) and 664 (1990) which discussed the humanitarian situation in Iraq and Kuwait and the detention of nationals from foreign countries, the Council decided to ask the 661 Committee to determine if humanitarian needs had arisen and to keep the situation under review. At the same time, it expected Iraq to comply with its obligations under international law, including the Fourth Geneva Convention, relating to the safety and detention of third-state nationals in Iraq and occupied Kuwait.

The Council then requested the Secretary-General to urgently seek information on the availability of food in Iraq and Kuwait, as well as pay attention to children, the elderly, expectant mothers and the sick, communicating all information to the committee. If the Committee found an urgent humanitarian need for foodstuffs, it was to report to the Council promptly with its decision as to how the need should be met. Furthermore, the committee was directed to bear in mind when formulating its decisions that foodstuffs should be provided through the United Nations in co-operation with appropriate humanitarian agencies such as the International Committee of the Red Cross to ensure the intended beneficiaries were reached. Finally, the resolution recommended the strict supervision of medical supplies by governments and humanitarian agencies exporting to Iraq and Kuwait.

Resolution 666 was adopted with 13 votes; Cuba and Yemen voted against the resolution, with Cuba stating that even though the use of disclaimers, the resolution amounted to "using starvation as a weapon of war", banned under Protocol 1 of the Geneva Conventions.

== See also ==
- Foreign relations of Iraq
- Gulf War
- Invasion of Kuwait
- Iraq–Kuwait relations
- List of United Nations Security Council Resolutions 601 to 700 (1987–1991)
