= United Nations Security Council Resolution 665 =

UN Security Council Resolution 665
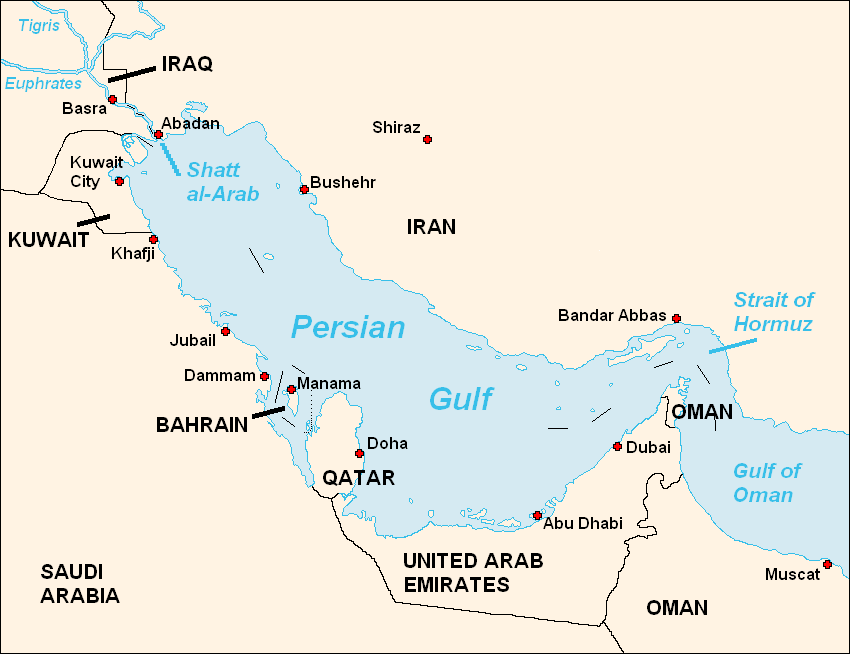
- The Persian Gulf
- Date: 25 August 1990
- Meeting no.: 2,938
- Code: S/RES/665 (Document)
- Subject: Iraq–Kuwait
- Voting summary: 13 voted for; None voted against; 2 abstained
- Result: Adopted

Security Council composition
- Permanent members: China; France; Soviet Union; United Kingdom; United States
- Non-permanent members: Canada; Colombia; Côte d'Ivoire; Cuba; Ethiopia; Finland; Malaysia; Romania; Yemen; Zaire

United Nations Security Council resolution 665, adopted on 25 August 1990, related to the aftermath of Iraq's invasion of Kuwait on 2 August 1990. After demanding the full and immediate implementation of resolutions 660, 661, 662 and 664, the Security Council authorised a naval blockade to enforce the embargo against Iraq, following its invasion of Kuwait.

On 6 August 1990, after the Iraqi invasion of Kuwait, the Security Council adopted Resolution 661 (1990) which imposed economic sanctions on Iraq, providing for a full trade embargo, excluding medical supplies, food and other items of humanitarian necessity, these to be determined by the Security Council sanctions committee. After authorising the naval blockade, the council invited Member States to co-operate with one another, and with the Military Staff Committee, to ensure compliance with the provisions of Resolution 661 (1990). It also requested the Secretary-General to report back to the council on developments in the situation.

Resolution 665 was adopted by 13 votes to none, with two abstentions from Cuba and Yemen. It avoided invoking the authority and purview of the council under Article 42, Chapter VII, which would make the blockade legally enforceable.

== See also ==
- Foreign relations of Iraq
- Gulf War
- Iraq–Kuwait relations
- List of United Nations Security Council Resolutions 601 to 700 (1987–1991)
