= United Nations Security Council Resolution 664 =

UN Security Council Resolution 664
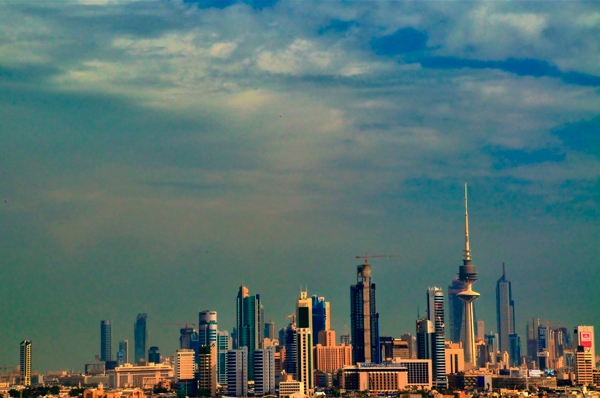
- Kuwait City
- Date: 18 August 1990
- Meeting no.: 2,937
- Code: S/RES/664 (Document)
- Subject: Iraq–Kuwait
- Voting summary: 15 voted for; None voted against; None abstained
- Result: Adopted

Security Council composition
- Permanent members: China; France; Soviet Union; United Kingdom; United States
- Non-permanent members: Canada; Colombia; Côte d'Ivoire; Cuba; Ethiopia; Finland; Malaysia; Romania; Yemen; Zaire

United Nations Security Council resolution 664, adopted unanimously on 18 August 1990, reaffirming resolutions 660 (1990), 661 (1990) and 662 (1990), the Council recalled Iraq's obligations under international law and acting under Chapter VII of the United Nations Charter, demanded that Iraq permit and facilitate the departure of third-country nationals from Iraq and Kuwait, and called for consular and diplomatic access to such nationals.

The Council went on to demand that Iraq take no action that would jeopardise the safety of the nationals, reaffirming that the annexation of Kuwait was illegal, therefore demanding that Iraq rescind its orders to close consular and diplomatic missions in Kuwait and the removal of diplomatic immunity of their personnel. Thousands of foreigners were in Iraq and Kuwait at the time of the Iraqi invasion, and the Council denounced Iraq's decision to use foreign nationals as "human shields" at strategic sites.

Resolution 664 finally requested the Secretary-General Javier Pérez de Cuéllar to report on the compliance with the current resolution as soon as possible.

== See also ==
- Foreign relations of Iraq
- Gulf War
- Invasion of Kuwait
- Iraq–Kuwait relations
- List of United Nations Security Council Resolutions 601 to 700 (1987–1991)
