= United Nations Security Council Resolution 662 =

United Nations Security Council resolution

UN Security Council Resolution 662
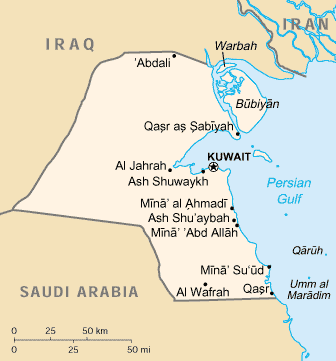
- Kuwait
- Date: 9 August 1990
- Meeting no.: 2,934
- Code: S/RES/662 (Document)
- Subject: Iraq–Kuwait
- Voting summary: 15 voted for; None voted against; None abstained
- Result: Adopted

Security Council composition
- Permanent members: China; France; Soviet Union; United Kingdom; United States
- Non-permanent members: Canada; Colombia; Côte d'Ivoire; Cuba; Ethiopia; Finland; Malaysia; Romania; Yemen; Zaire

Through the United Nations Security Council resolution 662, adopted unanimously on 9 August 1990, recalling resolutions 660 (1990) and 661 (1990), the Council decided that the annexation of Kuwait by Iraq under any form was illegal.

The Council called upon all States and international organisations not to recognise the annexation, further asking States to refrain from any action that might constitute an indirect recognition of the annexation. It also demanded that Iraq rescind its actions in Kuwait after the invasion, keeping the situation on its agenda.

== See also ==
- Foreign relations of Iraq
- Gulf War
- Invasion of Kuwait
- Iraq–Kuwait relations
- List of United Nations Security Council Resolutions 601 to 700 (1987–1991)
