= United Nations Security Council Resolution 661 =

UN Security Council Resolution 661
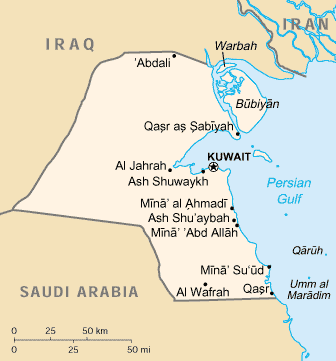
- Kuwait
- Date: 6 August 1990
- Meeting no.: 2,933
- Code: S/RES/661 (Document)
- Subject: Iraq–Kuwait
- Voting summary: 13 voted for; None voted against; 2 abstained
- Result: Adopted

Security Council composition
- Permanent members: China; France; Soviet Union; United Kingdom; United States
- Non-permanent members: Canada; Colombia; Ivory Coast; Cuba; Ethiopia; Finland; Malaysia; Romania; Yemen; Zaire

In United Nations Security Council resolution 661, adopted on 6 August 1990, reaffirming Resolution 660 (1990) and noting Iraq's refusal to comply with it and Kuwait's right of self-defence, the council took steps to implement international sanctions on Iraq under Chapter VII of the United Nations Charter. This was the second resolution by the Security Council over the invasion of Kuwait.

The council decided that states should prevent:

(a) the import of all products and commodities originating in Iraq or Kuwait;
(b) any activities by their nationals or in their territories that would promote the export of products originating in Iraq or Kuwait, as well as the transfer of funds to either country for the purposes of such activities;
(c) the sale of weapons or other military equipment to Iraq and Kuwait, excluding humanitarian aid;
(d) the availability of funds or other financial or economic resources to either country, or to any commercial, industrial or public utility operating within them, except for medical or humanitarian purposes.

Resolution 661 called on all member states, including non-members of the United Nations, to act strictly in accordance with the resolution, and decided to establish a Committee of the Security Council consisting of all members of the council, to examine reports by the Secretary-General Javier Pérez de Cuéllar on the situation and seek information from states on the action they are taking to implement Resolution 661, requesting they all co-operate with the committee.

Finally, the council stressed that the sanctions regime imposed should not affect assistance given to the legitimate Government of Kuwait. The resolution was adopted by 13 votes to none, while Cuba and Yemen abstained from voting.

After the end of the Gulf War and the Iraqi withdrawal from Kuwait, the sanctions were linked to removal of weapons of mass destruction by Resolution 687 (1991). The effects of government policy and the sanctions regime led to hyperinflation, widespread poverty and malnutrition in Iraq.

== The 661 Committee ==
The committee established under the resolution became commonly known as the 661 Committee, or alternatively as the Iraq Sanctions Committee. Although the initial mandate of the 661 Committee was quite modest, it took on broad responsibilities in the implementation of the sanctions. Joy Gordon, a scholar on the Iraq sanctions wrote:

The 661 Committee determined what goods Iraq could import as humanitarian exemptions, responded to allegations of smuggling, determined what goods the UN agencies engaged in humanitarian work could bring into Iraq, addressed issues involving the no-fly zones, and took upon itself the task of interpreting Security Council resolutions regarding Iraq.

Before the Oil-for-Food Programme commenced in 1996, exemptions from the sanctions regime granted by the 661 Committee was the sole legal means for Iraq to import any goods.

== See also ==
- Foreign relations of Iraq
- Gulf War
- Invasion of Kuwait
- Iraq–Kuwait relations
- Iraq sanctions
- List of United Nations Security Council Resolutions 601 to 700 (1987–1991)
