= United Nations Security Council Resolution 660 =

UN Security Council Resolution 660
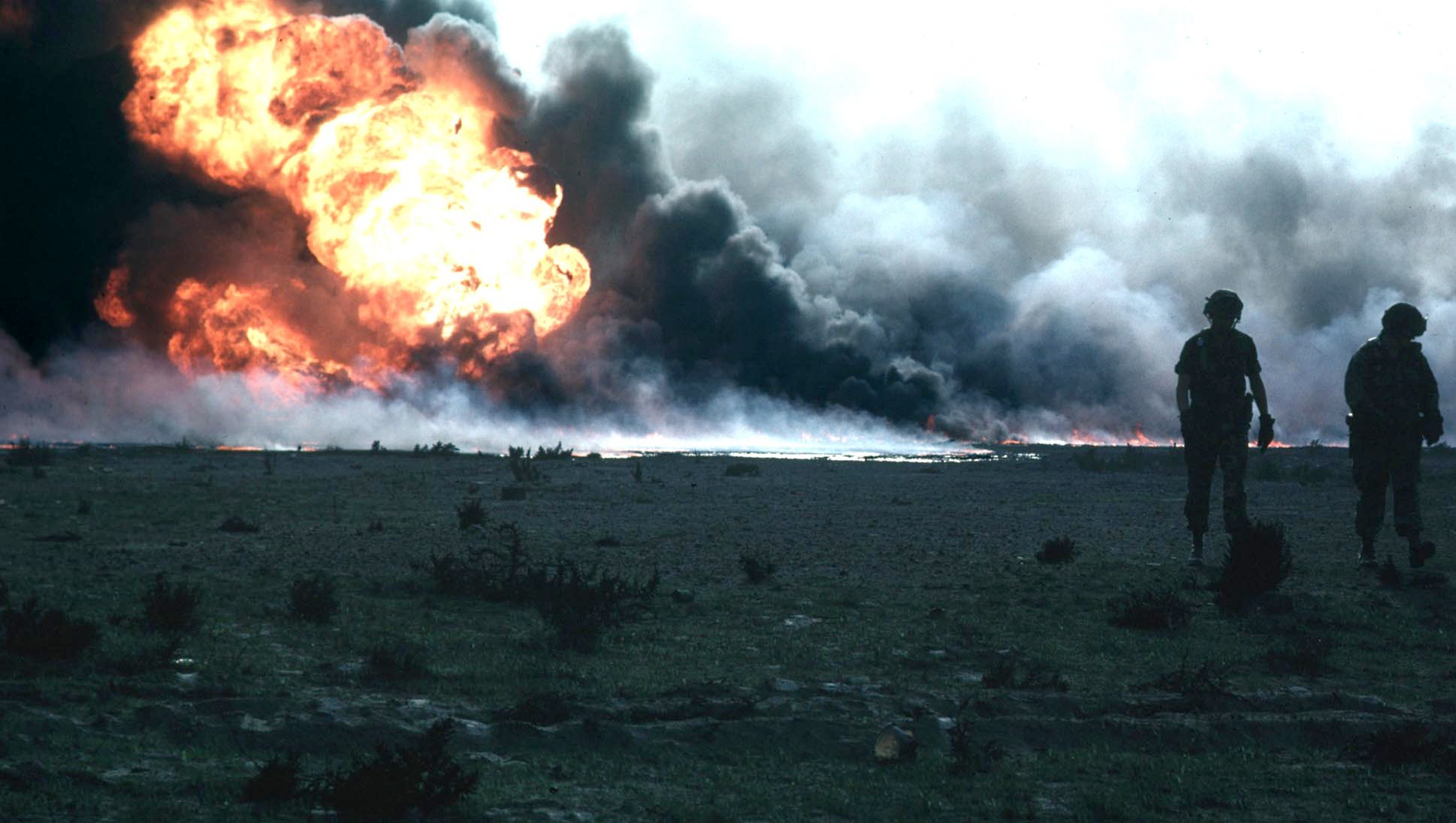
- Kuwaiti oil fields on fire
- Date: 2 August 1990
- Meeting no.: 2,932
- Code: S/RES/660 (Document)
- Subject: Iraq–Kuwait
- Voting summary: 14 voted for; None voted against; None abstained; 1 present not voting
- Result: Adopted

Security Council composition
- Permanent members: China; France; Soviet Union; United Kingdom; United States
- Non-permanent members: Canada; Colombia; Côte d'Ivoire; Cuba; Ethiopia; Finland; Malaysia; Romania; Yemen; Zaire

United Nations Security Council resolution 660 was adopted on 2 August 1990 by the United Nations Security Council. Through the resolution, while noting its alarm of the invasion of Kuwait by Iraq, the council condemned the invasion and demanded Iraq withdraw immediately and unconditionally to positions as they were on 1 August 1990.

Yemen called upon Iraq and Kuwait to enter into immediate negotiations to resolve their differences, thanking the Arab League for its efforts. Talks between both sides had broken down the day before in Jeddah, Saudi Arabia. The council also decided to meet again as necessary to ensure compliance with the current resolution.

The resolution was adopted by 14 votes to none, while Yemen did not participate in voting. It was the first of twelve resolutions the UN Security Council adopted in 1990.

== See also ==
- Foreign relations of Iraq
- Gulf War
- Invasion of Kuwait
- Iraq–Kuwait relations
- List of United Nations Security Council Resolutions 601 to 700 (1987–1991)
