= Iraq–Kuwait relations =

- Iraq: Kuwait

The relations between Iraq and Kuwait are longstanding and complex, experiencing many changes through recent decades.

== History ==
=== Ancient Era ===
During the Ubaid period (6500 BC), Kuwait was the central site of interaction between the peoples of Mesopotamia and Neolithic Eastern Arabia, including Bahra 1 and site H3 in Subiya.

Mesopotamians first settled in the Kuwaiti island of Failaka in 2000 BC Traders from the Sumerian city of Ur inhabited Failaka and ran a mercantile business. The island had many Mesopotamian-style buildings typical of those found in Iraq dating from around 2000 BC.

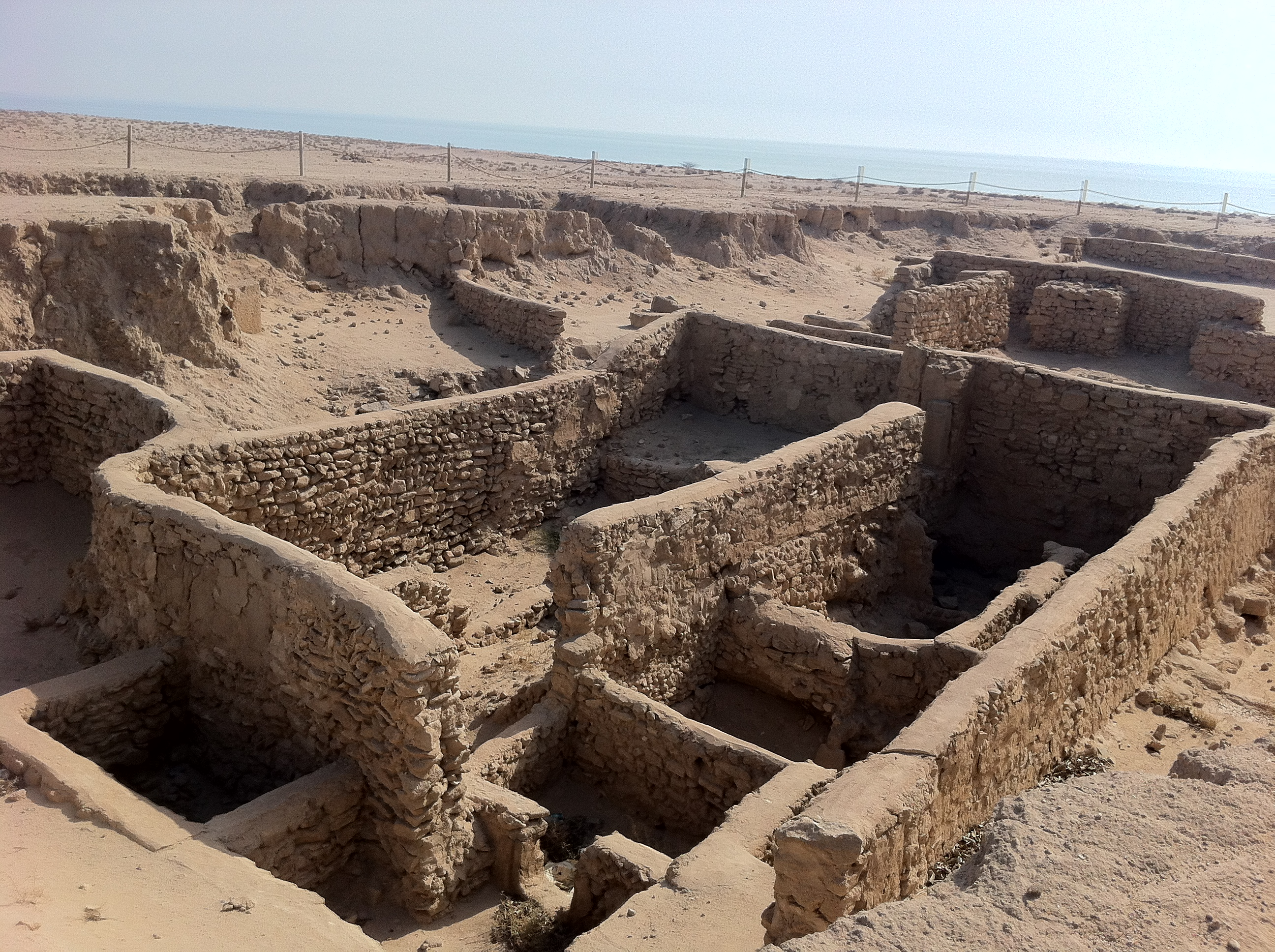
Antiquities of Failaka island

After the Dilmun civilization, Failaka was inhabited by the Kassites of Mesopotamia, and was formally under the control of the Kassite dynasty of Babylon. Many of the artifacts found in Failaka are linked to Mesopotamian civilizations.

Under Nebuchadnezzar II, the bay of Kuwait was under Babylonian control. Cuneiform documents found in Failaka indicate the presence of Babylonians in the island's population. Babylonian kings were present in Failaka during the Neo-Babylonian Empire period; Nabonidus had a governor in Failaka and Nebuchadnezzar II had a palace and temple in Failaka. Failaka also contained temples dedicated to the worship of Shamash, the Mesopotamian sun god in the Babylonian pantheon.

=== Classical Era ===
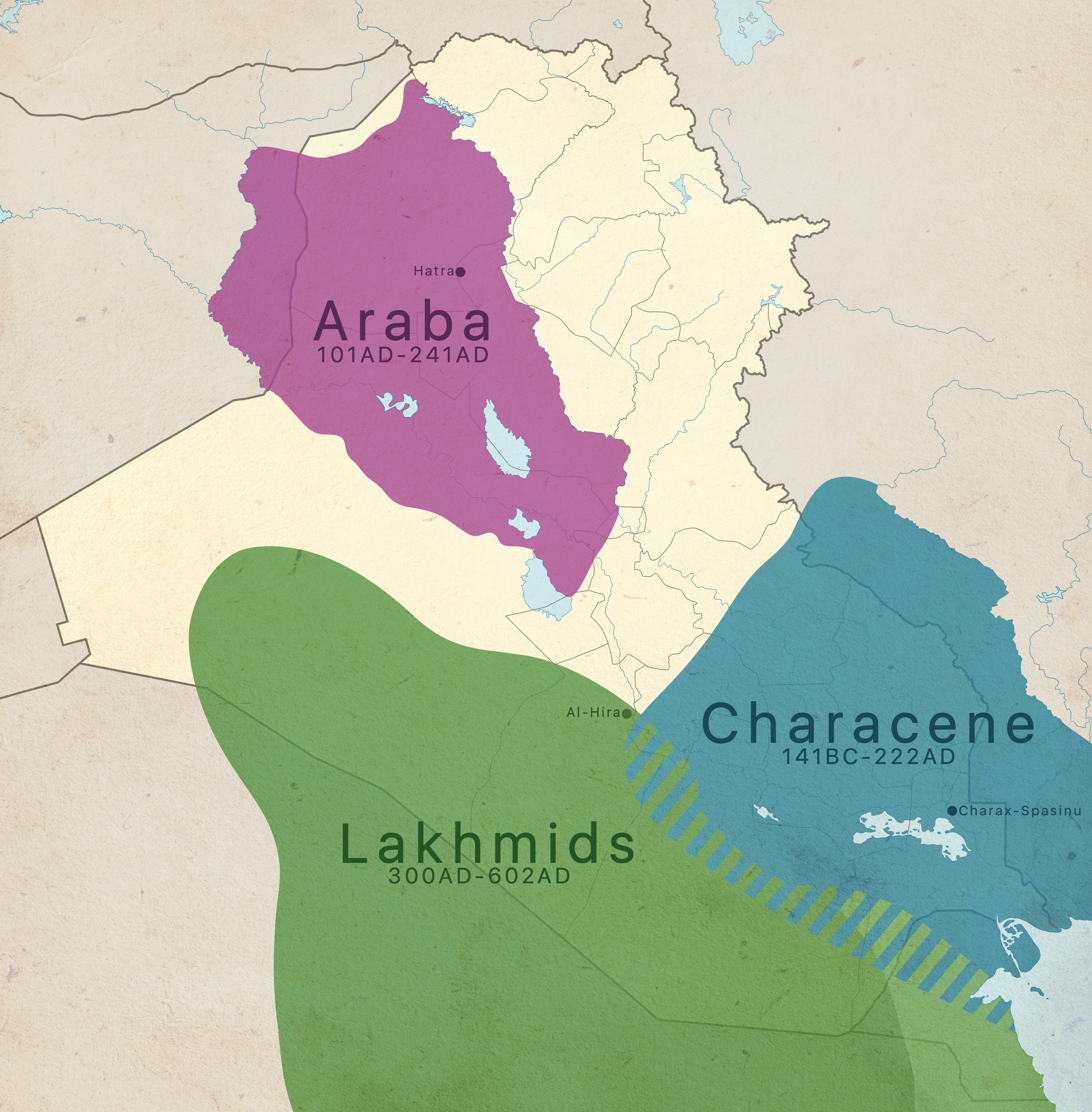
Pre-Islamic Arab Kingdoms in Iraq and Kuwait.

In the 6th century BC, Mesopotamia, Failaka Island and the Bay of Kuwait were conquered by the Achaemenid Empire.

By the 4th century BC, both regions came under the rule of Alexander the Great.

In 141 BC, southern Iraq and Kuwait made up the Hellenistic Characene Kingdom, a Parthian vassal. Important cities spanned both countries, such as Teredon in Kuwait and Alexandria in Iraq.

Between 293 and 602 AD, the regions continued to be a Persian vassal during the Lakhmid period. The city of Kazma held most of Kuwait's urban population and fell under the direct rule of Al-Hirah in Iraq.

=== Medieval Era ===
In 636 AD, the Battle of Chains and Battle of al-Qadisiyyah brought both Iraq and Kuwait into the fold of the Rashidun Caliphate. At the time, Kuwait was under the control of the Sasanian Empire, ruled from Ctesiphon in Iraq.

As a result of the Rashidun victory in 636 AD, the Bay of Kuwait and Kazma came under the control of the Muslims. The city functioned as a trade port and resting place for pilgrims on their way from Iraq to Hejaz. Basran poet Al-Farazdaq was born in Kazma.

=== Early modern period ===
In 1521, Kuwait was under Portuguese control and by 1529, Nuno da Cunha took control of Basra in Iraq. Portuguese influence in both regions ended around the mid-17th century. Iraq and Kuwait were then conquered by the Ottomans in 1668. They would then be fought over by Turks and Persians in a series of repeated attempts at resistance over a century.

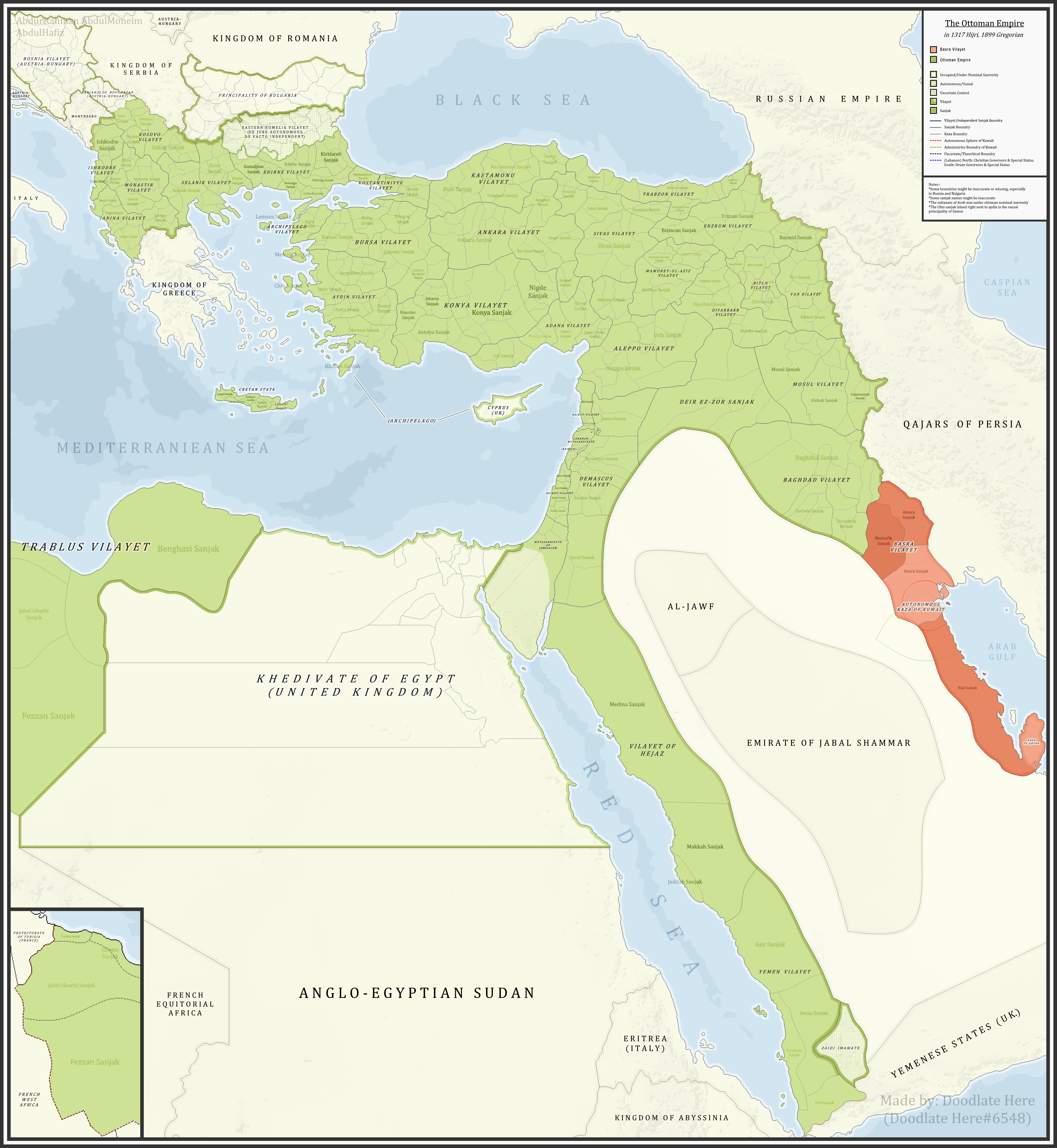
The Basra Vilayet in 1899

The House of Al-Sabah, the current ruling family of Kuwait, were expelled from Umm Qasr in southern Iraq by the Ottomans due to their practice of preying on caravans in Basra and trading ships in the Shatt al-Arab. According to oral tradition, the Al Sabah family settled across various regions in southern Iraq until they finally settled in what is now Kuwait around the mid-1700s. During the Persian siege of Basra in 1775–1779, Iraqi merchants took refuge in Kuwait and were instrumental in the expansion of Kuwait's boatbuilding and trading activities. As a result, Kuwait's maritime commerce boomed and the flight of many of Basra's leading merchants to Kuwait continued to play a significant role in Basra's commercial stagnation well into the 1850s. In 1875, the Ottomans responded to local pressure from the Shi'as of the south by detaching the southern districts of the Baghdad vilayet and creating a new Vilayet of Basra. Kuwait was considered to be an autonomous kingdom in the Vilayet of Basra up until 1913, despite the Anglo-Kuwaiti Agreement of 1899. Kuwait and Iraq would both go on to be part of the British Empire after the Mesopotamian Campaign (1914-1918).

=== Kingdom of Iraq Era ===
In the 1930s, a popular movement emerged in Kuwait which called for the unification of the country with Iraq. In 1938, this movement coalesced into the Free Kuwaiti Movement, established by Kuwaiti youths opposed to British influence in the region. The movement submitted a petition to the Iraqi government demanding that it support the unification of Kuwait and Iraq. Fearing that the movement would turn into an armed rebellion, the Al-Sabah family agreed to the establishment of a legislative council to represent the Free Kuwaiti Movement and its political demands. The council's first meeting in 1938 resulted in a unanimous resolution demanding the unification of Kuwait and Iraq. The 1938 National Assembly was formally dissolved in 1939 after "one member, Sulaiman al-Adasani, in possession of a letter, signed by other Assembly members, addressed to Iraq's King Ghazi, requesting Kuwait's immediate incorporation into Iraq". This demand came after the merchant members of the Assembly attempted to extract oil money from Ahmad Al-Jaber Al-Sabah, a suggestion refused by him and upon which he instigated a crackdown in which Assembly members were arrested in 1939.

In March 1939, an armed rebellion broke out in Kuwait by supporters of the movement, seeking to unify Kuwait with Iraq by force. Supported by the British, the Al-Sabah family rapidly suppressed the rebellion, imprisoning numerous supporters of the movement. King Ghazi of Iraq publicly demanded that the prisoners be released and the Al-Sabah family end their repressive policies towards members of the Free Kuwaiti Movement. King Ghazi died in April 1939 in an accident at the age of 27, involving a sports car that he was driving. According to the scholars Ma'ruf al-Rusafi and Safa Khulusi, a common view by many Iraqis at the time was that he was killed on the orders of Nuri al-Said because of his plans for the unification of Iraq with Kuwait.

Attempts by King Faisal II of Iraq to build a railway to Kuwait and port facilities on the Persian Gulf were rejected by the United Kingdom. These and other similar British colonial policies made Kuwait a focus of the Arab national movement in Iraq, and a symbol of Iraqi humiliation at the hands of the British.

Following renewed Iraqi claims to Kuwait during the mid-1950s, Iraqi Prime Minister Nuri al-Sa'id reportedly raised the issue at a meeting of the Baghdad Pact in January 1958, advocating the incorporation of Kuwait into Iraq. According to some accounts, Iraq subsequently informed the British government that it intended to publish documents and memoranda concerning the dispute. These accounts further claim that British officials indicated they had "approved in principle" of unification and proposed a meeting in London between British and Iraqi leaders to finalize the matter. However, the meeting never took place, as the Iraqi monarchy was overthrown during the 14 July Revolution in 1958, in which King Faisal II and Nuri al-Sa'id were killed. Britain immediately thereafter abrogated the agreement, presumably due to Qasim's anti-British sentiment and opposition to foreign imperialism.

=== Post-Kuwaiti Independence ===
Ever since Kuwait's independence in 1961, successive Iraqi governments have sought various opportunities to reclaim and annex Kuwait. In 1961, a short-lived crisis evolved into Operation Vantage, as the Iraqi government threatened to invade Kuwait; the invasion was averted following plans by the Arab League to form an international Arab force against Iraqi designs on Kuwait. The 1973 Sanita border skirmish evolved on 20 March 1973 when Iraqi army units occupied El-Samitah near the Kuwaiti border, provoking an international crisis. The relationship experienced a decade of thaw following the Iran–Iraq War, with Kuwait and other Gulf states supporting Iraq against Iran.

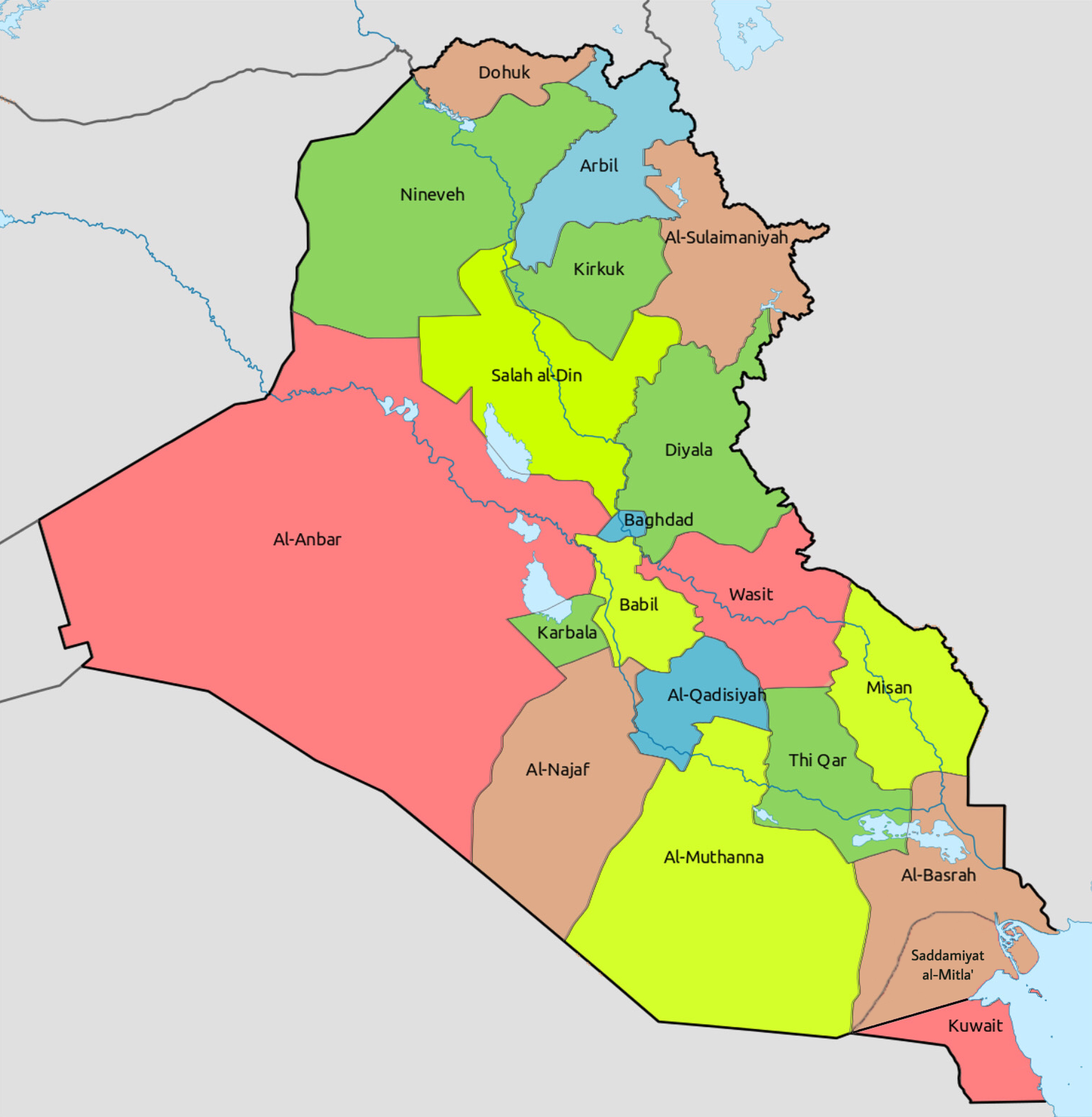
Kuwaiti territory was temporarily annexed and proclaimed by Saddam Hussein as a governorate of Iraq during the Gulf War

Furthermore, in order to avoid a repeat of the 1939 rebellion, the Kuwait government has been accused of politically-motivated demographic engineering. In the three decades after independence in 1961, the Al-Sabah ruling family has permitted the forgeries of hundreds of thousands of politically-motivated naturalizations, while simultaneously denying citizenship to Bedoon tribes from northern Kuwait (most belonging to the Muntafiq confederation) who are perceived to be of Iraqi origin, despite living in Kuwait before 1920. The politically-motivated naturalizations were noted by the United Nations, political activists, scholars, researchers, and even members of the Al-Sabah family. Kuwaiti authorities are estimated to have naturalized 400,000 Bedouin immigrants, predominantly Sunni Saudis from southern tribes. The foreign Bedouin immigrants were mainly naturalized to alter the demographic makeup of the citizen population in a way that makes the power of the Al-Sabah ruling family more secure, as they are seen as more loyal than Bedoon groups.

In 1990, Iraq had invaded Kuwait under a pretext of various reasons. The most commonly cited reason were Kuwait slant drilling into Iraq, GCC states refusing to forgive $37 billion worth of loans Iraq borrowed during the Iran-Iraq War and the overproduction of oil which kept revenues down for Iraq. Saddam regarded this as a diplomatic betrayal, given that the war had inflicted an estimated 105,000–500,000 casualties and $561 billion in economic losses on Iraq, despite his claim that it had been fought to defend the Gulf states against Iranian expansionism. Despite the UAE and Kuwait offering to lower oil production from 2m to 1.5m barrels and Kuwait offering to reimburse Iraq $500m for slant drilling, Saddam had already decided on the invasion, believing he had the tacit approval of the United States following a meeting with U.S. Ambassador to Iraq, April Glaspie, who stated, "We have no opinion on the Arab-Arab conflicts, like your border disagreement with Kuwait."

The invasion started on 2 August 1990. Within two days of intense combat, most of the Kuwaiti Armed Forces were either overrun by the Iraqi Republican Guard or escaped to neighbouring Saudi Arabia and Bahrain. The state of Kuwait was annexed and proclaimed as Iraq’s 19th province. During the Gulf War, Kuwait would soon be liberated by coalition forces. In July 1992 the matter of border demarcation was referred to the United Nations, which accurately mapped the boundary and then demarcated it on the ground, following the 1932 line with some small adjustments. The border initially was accepted by Kuwait but not Iraq. Iraq accepted the border in November 1994. Since the fall of the Ba'ath Party regime in Iraq, relations have significantly improved between the two states.

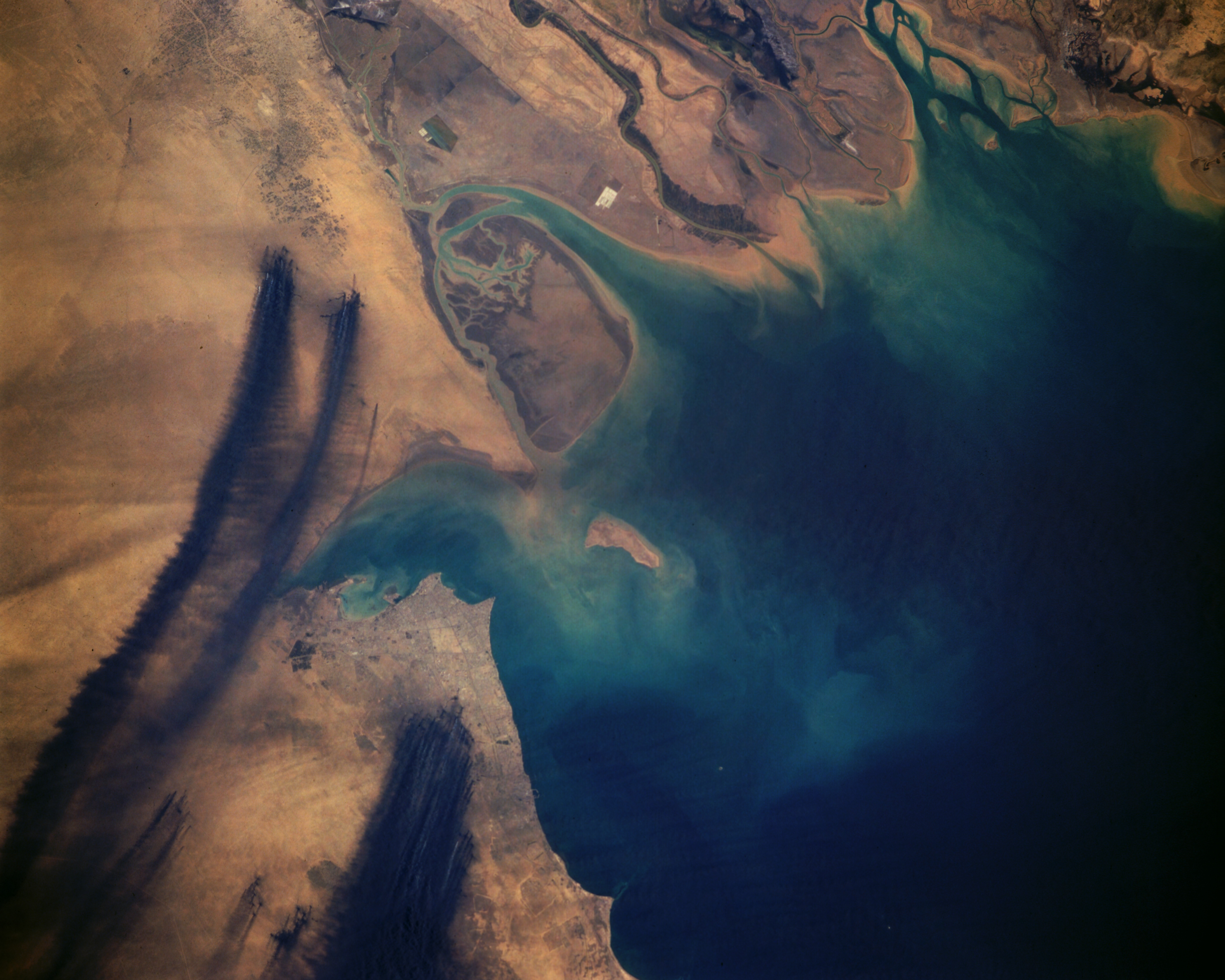
Smoke from burning Kuwait oil fields that Saddam Hussein ordered set fire to during the Gulf War

In the mid-to-late 2010s, Kuwait hosted the international Iraq reconstruction conference and was Iraq's biggest financial investor in the conference. On 19 June 2019, Emir of Kuwait Sabah Al-Ahmad Al-Jaber Al-Sabah visited Iraq for the second time following the 2012 Arab League summit in Baghdad.

In 2019, Iraq was Kuwait's leading export market, and agricultural products accounted for 94.2% of total export commodities.

In August 2019, Iraq sent a protest letter to the United Nations regarding the geographical changes that the Government of Kuwait has made in the maritime area that lies beyond marker 162 in Khor Abdullah by upraising a shoal, which is designated as Fisht al-Aych; the letter also protested the installation of an observation tower at Fisht al-Aych.

In March 2021, Iraq has so far paid $49.5 billion in war reparations to Kuwait while Iraq's dues now amount to only $2.5 billion. On 13 January 2022, Iraq made its final reparations payment to Kuwait, with a claim of $52.4 billion being paid off. In response, the United Nations Compensation Commission declared Iraq as having fully paid its compensation to Kuwait for the invasion and occupation.

Kuwait's plans for economic development, such as the "Silk City project", involves developing mutually beneficial economic ties with Iraq. Kuwait Vision 2035 entails the development of northern Kuwait (near the Iraq border and key Iraqi cities). Economic projects like the Abdali Economic Zone are designed to cater to Iraqi markets.

In February 2023, Kuwait's foreign minister Sheikh Salem Abdullah Al-Jaber Al-Sabah said Iraq and Kuwait would hold talks aimed at resolving the maritime border dispute between the two countries.

On 4 September 2023, the Federal Supreme Court of Iraq annulled a law passed in 2013 that regulated navigation in the Khor Abdullah waterway between the two states, on the grounds that it should have been passed by a two-thirds majority in parliament instead of a simple majority. On 20 September 2023, a GCC-U.S. joint statement called for the complete demarcation of Kuwaiti-Iraqi maritime borders.

== Resident diplomatic missions ==
- Iraq has an embassy in Kuwait City.
- Kuwait has an embassy in Baghdad and consulates-general in Basra and Erbil.

== See also ==
- Foreign relations of Iraq
- Foreign relations of Kuwait
- Iraq–Kuwait border
