= United Nations Security Council Resolution 588 =

United Nations Security Council resolution

UN Security Council Resolution 588
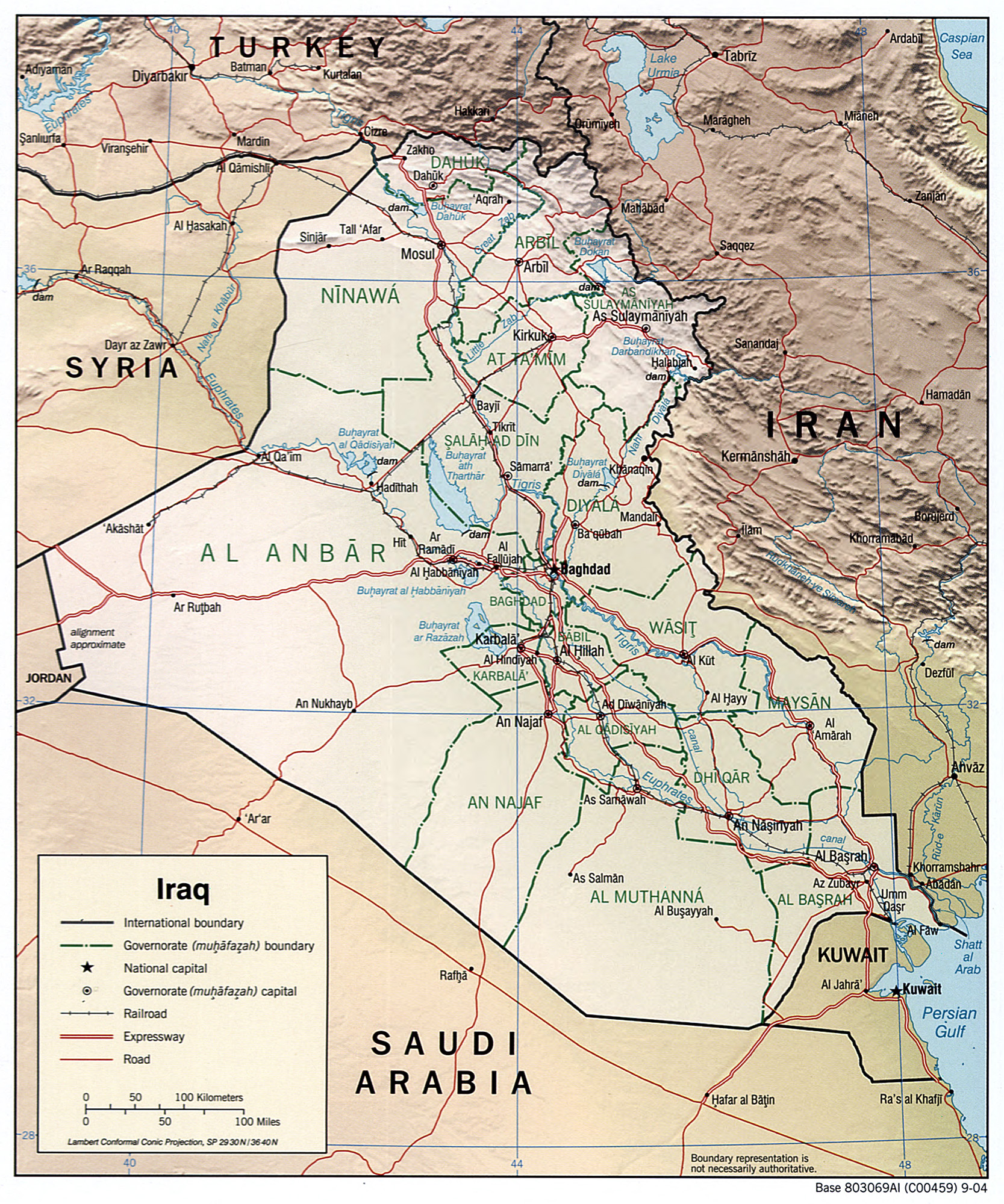
- Map of Iraq
- Date: 8 October 1986
- Meeting no.: 2,713
- Code: S/RES/588 (Document)
- Subject: Iran–Iraq
- Voting summary: 15 voted for; None voted against; None abstained
- Result: Adopted

Security Council composition
- Permanent members: China; France; Soviet Union; United Kingdom; United States
- Non-permanent members: Australia; Bulgaria; Congo; Denmark; Ghana; Madagascar; Thailand; Trinidad and Tobago; United Arab Emirates; Venezuela

United Nations Security Council Resolution 588, adopted unanimously on 8 October 1986, after expressing concern at the continuation of the conflict between Iran and Iraq, the Council urged both countries to implement Resolution 582 (1986) without delay.

The resolution requested the Secretary-General to intensify his efforts to give effect to ensure Resolution 582 is implemented, reporting back no later than 30 November 1986. The Secretary-General, in his report published on 24 November, stated he had established communications with both countries, but that the positions from both governments showed no convergence which would allow for the implementation of the current resolution.

== See also ==
- Iran–Iraq relations
- Iran–Iraq War
- List of United Nations Security Council Resolutions 501 to 600 (1982–1987)
- Resolutions 479, 514, 522, 540, 552, 582, 598, 612, 616, 619 and 620
