= United Nations Security Council Resolution 479 =

UN Security Council Resolution 479
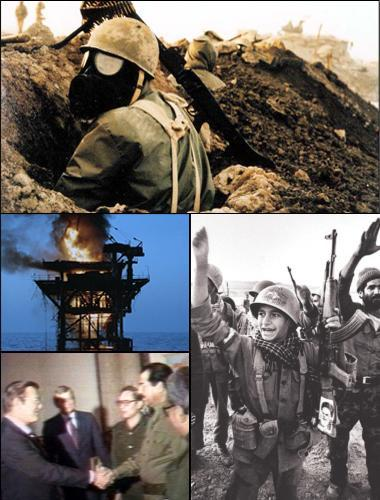
- Iran-Iraq War
- Date: 28 September 1980
- Meeting no.: 2,248
- Code: S/RES/479 (Document)
- Subject: Iraq-Islamic Republic of Iran
- Voting summary: 15 voted for; None voted against; None abstained
- Result: Adopted

Security Council composition
- Permanent members: China; France; Soviet Union; United Kingdom; United States
- Non-permanent members: Bangladesh; East Germany; Jamaica; Mexico; Niger; Norway; Philippines; Portugal; Tunisia; Zambia

United Nations Security Council resolution 479, adopted unanimously on 28 September 1980, after reminding Member States against the use of threats and force in their international relations, the Council called upon Iran and Iraq to immediately cease any further uses of force and instead settle their dispute through negotiations.

The resolution went on to urge both countries to accept any appropriate offer of mediation, while calling on other Member States to refrain from causing acts that may lead to a further escalation of tensions in the region.

Iraq answererd the call to attempt to cease force, accepting the resolution, while Iran refused to accept the peace offer.

The Council praised the work of the Secretary-General on the matter and requested him to report back to the Security Council within 48 hours.

== See also ==
- Iran–Iraq relations
- Iran–Iraq War
- List of United Nations Security Council Resolutions 401 to 500 (1976–1982)
- Resolutions 514, 522, 540, 552, 582, 588, 598, 612, 616, 619 and 620
