= United Nations Security Council Resolution 582 =

UN Security Council Resolution 582
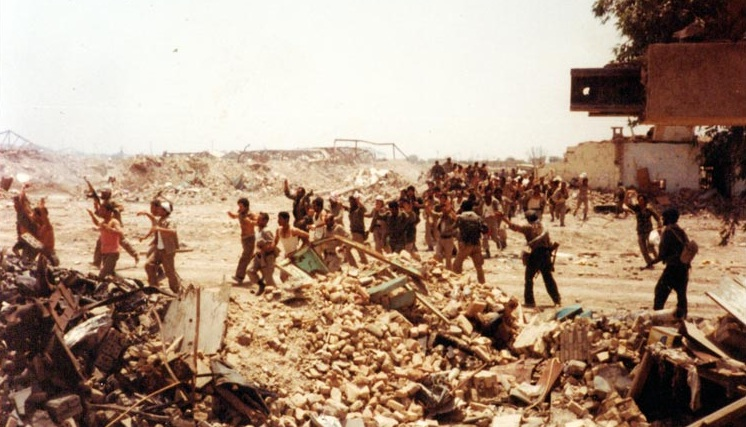
- Iraqi prisoners of war in Iran
- Date: 24 February 1986
- Meeting no.: 2,666
- Code: S/RES/582 (Document)
- Subject: Iran–Iraq
- Voting summary: 15 voted for; None voted against; None abstained
- Result: Adopted

Security Council composition
- Permanent members: China; France; Soviet Union; United Kingdom; United States
- Non-permanent members: Australia; Bulgaria; Congo; Denmark; Ghana; Madagascar; Thailand; Trinidad and Tobago; United Arab Emirates; Venezuela

United Nations Security Council resolution 582, adopted unanimously on 24 February 1986, after noting that the council had been seized for six years and the continued conflict between Iran and Iraq, the council deplored the initial acts that started the Iran–Iraq War and continuation of the conflict.

The Council then condemned the escalation of the conflict, including territorial incursions, the bombing of civilian areas, attacks on neutral shipping, violation of international law and use of chemical weapons by Iraq, contrary to the Geneva Protocol of 1925.

The resolution called upon Iran and Iraq to cease hositilies and observe a ceasefire, with a complete withdrawal of military forces to their internationally recognised borders, as well as an exchange of prisoners of war facilitated by the International Committee of the Red Cross. It also urged both parties to submit all aspects of the conflict immediately to mediation and requested the Secretary-General Javier Pérez de Cuéllar to continue his efforts in the mediation process.

Compliance with Resolution 582 was voluntary, and both parties refused to implement it.

== See also ==
- Iran–Iraq relations
- Iran–Iraq War
- List of United Nations Security Council Resolutions 501 to 600 (1982–1987)
- Resolutions 479, 514, 522, 540, 552, 588, 598, 612, 616, 619 and 620
