= Peace efforts during the Iran–Iraq War =

Throughout the duration of the Iran–Iraq War, numerous efforts were made to halt hostilities and initiate discussions on the unresolved issues that precipitated the onset of the war; however, these endeavors proved unsuccessful. Iraq put forward a suggestion for a temporary suspension of hostilities lasting four days on 1 October 1980, a mere eight days after the commencement of conflict. Iran declined the offer. Khomeini issued a response on 4 October, in which he declined the offer of a truce and directed for the conflict to persist until a conclusive victory was attained, along with seeking retribution for Iraq's "crimes". U.S. and Soviet officials convened in Vienna on February 21–22, 1985, with the intention of addressing the ongoing Iran-Iraq war. However, President Reagan downplayed the significance of the meeting, stating that it was primarily an opportunity for both parties to exchange perspectives.

== Iran ==
Iranian Parliament Speaker Hashemi Rafsanjani declared on 23 March 1981 that Iran would not agree to the ceasefire proposal until the government led by Saddam Hussein is removed from power. In the beginning of April 1981, the dominant political party in Iran, the Islamic Republican Party, asserted that it was only willing to engage in dialogue with an Iraqi government that was a "true reflection of popular mandate", rather than the "current deceitful leaders in power in Baghdad". In July 1981, Iran declined a ceasefire proposal from Iraq for the duration of Ramadan.

== Iraq ==
During a public address on 15 March 1981, Iraqi President Saddam Hussein cautioned that if Iran did not agree to a ceasefire, Iraq would offer support to Iranian dissidents. Iraqi Foreign Minister Tariq Aziz attributed responsibility to Iran for initiating and prolonging the war during the fortieth session of the United Nations General Assembly on September 27, 1985. Aziz contended that Iran's explicit objective of toppling the political and social structures in Iraq and other neighboring nations in order to impose their own form of regressive, brutal governance was cited as the justification for the conflict.

== Organization of the Islamic Conference ==
On 9 February 1981, the two nations agreed to host Islamic leaders in order to collaborate on an Islamic peace proposal aimed at resolving the conflict.

On 28 February 1981, a high-level Islamic delegation visits Tehran with the objective of securing a cessation of hostilities. Authorities, however indicate that they will not to engage in negotiations to resolve the conflict until Iraqi troops have retreated from Iranian soil. On 4 March 1981, the Islamic Peace Mission put forth a comprehensive proposal for a cessation of hostilities, involving the retreat of conflicting factions, the establishment of a collaborative Islamic armed force, and ultimately the commencement of diplomatic talks. However, the proposal was quickly rejected by both the governments of Baghdad and Tehran. On 7 March, the Iranian Supreme Defense Council formally announced its disapproval of the suggestions for a cessation of hostilities and a diplomatic resolution with Iraq. On 12 March, the Islamic peace mission acknowledged the failure of its plan.

== Non-Aligned Movement ==
On 11 February 1981, the Iranian representatives left the Non-Aligned Movement conference after Sa'dun Hammadi, the Iraqi Foreign Minister, proposed a ceasefire, indicating Iraq's willingness to end the ongoing five-month conflict. Cuban Foreign Minister Isidoro Malmierca Peoli arrived in Beirut, Lebanon on 14 March 1981 to spearhead an effort by the Non-Aligned Movement to broker a ceasefire.

A delegation from Cuba, India, Zambia, and the Palestine Liberation Organization arrived in Tehran on 6 August 1981, to attempt to resolve the conflict.

== United Nations ==
On 16 January 1981, the United Nations Special Envoy Olof Palme made visits to both Tehran and Baghdad in an effort to broker a resolution to the conflict. On 17 February 1981, Olof Palme initiated his third trip to Iran and Iraq with the purpose of presenting detailed suggestions for a ceasefire and a diplomatic resolution. He departs from Tehran on 22 February following the failure of his mission. The Iranians said to him that a cessation of hostilities was not possible as long as Iraqi forces continued to occupy Iranian territory.

On March 1, 1982, Olof Palme proclaimed that he had been unsuccessful for the fifth occasion in persuading the two nations to agree to a ceasefire.

On October 31, 1983, the United Nations Security Council urged both Iran and Iraq to promptly halt hostilities in the Persian Gulf region. Iraq acknowledges the authority of the council, whereas Iran refutes it.

On September 27, 1984, the Japanese Foreign Minister Shintaro Abe presented a ceasefire initiative to the United Nations General Assembly aimed at resolving the Iran-Iraq War.

On July 18, 1988, Iran gave its approval to Security Council Resolution 598, demonstrating its compliance with international diplomatic measures.

The Security Council declared on August 8, 1988, that a ceasefire would take effect on August 20 at 07:00 local time, with the deployment of 350 international observers along the border. The two nations reached a consensus to dispatch delegates after five days in order to discuss unresolved matters and finalize a peace agreement through official negotiations.
