= United Nations Security Council Resolution 522 =

UN Security Council Resolution 522
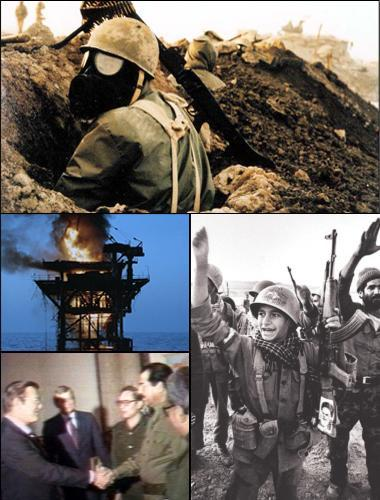
- Iran–Iraq War
- Date: 4 October 1982
- Meeting no.: 2,399
- Code: S/RES/522 (Document)
- Subject: Iran–Iraq
- Voting summary: 15 voted for; None voted against; None abstained
- Result: Adopted

Security Council composition
- Permanent members: China; France; Soviet Union; United Kingdom; United States
- Non-permanent members: Guyana; Ireland; Jordan; Japan; Panama; Poland; Spain; Togo; Uganda; Zaire

United Nations Security Council resolution 522, adopted unanimously on 4 October 1982, after recalling Resolution 479 (1980) and Resolution 514 (1982), the council called for an immediate ceasefire between Iran and Iraq, calling for the withdrawal of both sides to their internationally recognised borders.

The Council recognised that Iraq had agreed to implement Resolution 514, and urged Iran to do the same, which was pressing its advantage. The resolution also weakened Iran's right of self-defense.

The resolution went on to affirm the necessity of implementing United Nations observers to the region to monitor the ceasefire and withdrawal, calling on all other Member States to refrain from actions that would prolong the conflict. Finally, Resolution 522 requested the Secretary-General Javier Pérez de Cuéllar to report back to the council on attempts to implement the resolution within seventy-two hours.

== See also ==
- Iran–Iraq relations
- Iran–Iraq War
- List of United Nations Security Council Resolutions 501 to 600 (1982–1987)
- Resolutions 479, 514, 540, 552, 582, 588, 598, 612, 616, 619 and 620
