= United Nations Security Council Resolution 552 =

UN Security Council Resolution 552
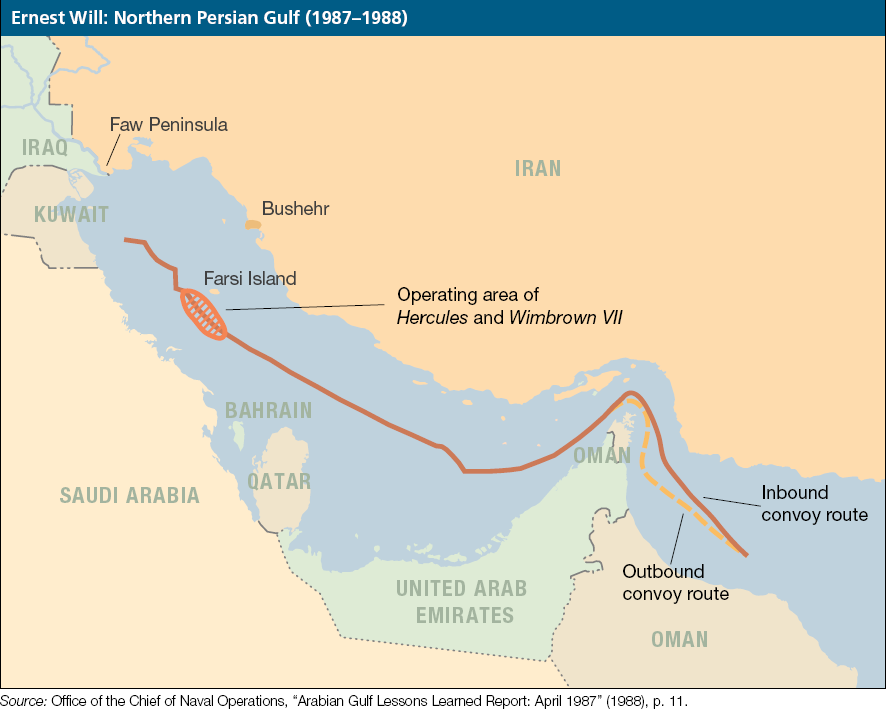
- Shipping route in the Persian Gulf
- Date: 1 June 1984
- Meeting no.: 2,546
- Code: S/RES/552 (Document)
- Subject: Iran–Iraq
- Voting summary: 13 voted for; None voted against; 2 abstained
- Result: Adopted

Security Council composition
- Permanent members: China; France; Soviet Union; United Kingdom; United States
- Non-permanent members: Egypt; India; Malta; Netherlands; Nicaragua; Pakistan; Peru; Ukrainian SSR; Upper Volta; Zimbabwe

United Nations Security Council resolution 552, adopted on 1 June 1984, after hearing complaints from Bahrain, Kuwait, Oman, Qatar, Saudi Arabia and the United Arab Emirates regarding attacks on their ships by Iran, the Council condemned the attacks, reiterating that Member States should refrain from using threats or use of force in their international relations.

The Council then called on all States to respect free navigation in international waters in accordance with international law, calling for respect for the territorial integrity for States that were not part of the conflict between Iran and Iraq. The resolution demanded Iran cease the attacks on the commercial ships to and from the ports of Kuwait and Saudi Arabia.

Resolution 552 concluded by stating that if the present resolution was not implemented, it would meet again to discuss further action it could take on the matter. It also requested the Secretary-General Javier Pérez de Cuéllar to report on the progress of the implementation of Resolution 552.

The resolution was adopted by 13 votes to none, with two abstentions from Nicaragua and Zimbabwe.

Though Resolution 552 condemned Iran for attacks on ships, Iraq had also attacked an unspecified number beforehand, which led to claims of one-sidedness by Iran. On the days following the adoption of this resolution, two Saudi Arabian F-15s shot down two Iranian F-4 Phantoms over Saudi Arabian airspace.

== See also ==
- Iran–Iraq relations
- Iran–Iraq War
- List of United Nations Security Council Resolutions 501 to 600 (1982–1987)
- Resolutions 479, 514, 522, 540, 582, 588, 598, 612, 616, 619 and 620
- The Tanker War
