= United Nations Security Council Resolution 514 =

UN Security Council Resolution 514
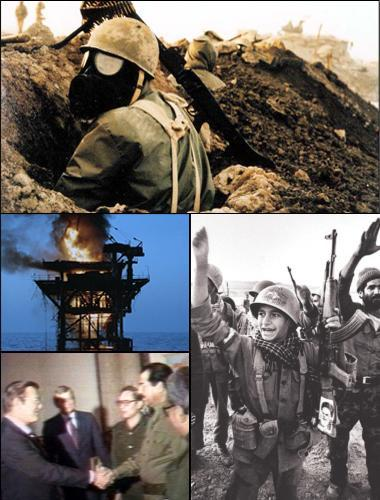
- Iran–Iraq War
- Date: 12 July 1982
- Meeting no.: 2,383
- Code: S/RES/514 (Document)
- Subject: Iran–Iraq
- Voting summary: 15 voted for; None voted against; None abstained
- Result: Adopted

Security Council composition
- Permanent members: China; France; Soviet Union; United Kingdom; United States
- Non-permanent members: Guyana; Ireland; Jordan; Japan; Panama; Poland; Spain; Togo; Uganda; Zaire

United Nations Security Council resolution 514, adopted unanimously on 12 July 1982, after recalling Resolution 479 (1980) and noting the mediation efforts by the Secretary-General, Organisation of the Islamic Conference and the Non-Aligned Movement, the council expressed its deep concern at the prolonged conflict between Iran and Iraq.

Resolution 514 then called for a ceasefire between the two countries and a withdrawal by both to their internationally recognised border. It also asked the Secretary-General Javier Pérez de Cuéllar to continue with the mediation efforts and to report back to the council on attempts to implement the resolution within three months.

== See also ==
- Iran–Iraq relations
- Iran–Iraq War
- List of United Nations Security Council Resolutions 501 to 600 (1982–1987)
- Resolutions 479, 522, 540, 552, 582, 588, 598, 612, 616, 619 and 620
