= United Nations Security Council Resolution 619 =

UN Security Council Resolution 619
- Iraq (orange) and Iran (green)
- Date: 9 August 1988
- Meeting no.: 2,824
- Code: S/RES/619 (Document)
- Subject: Iran–Iraq
- Voting summary: 15 voted for; None voted against; None abstained
- Result: Adopted

Security Council composition
- Permanent members: China; France; Soviet Union; United Kingdom; United States
- Non-permanent members: Algeria; Argentina; Brazil; Italy; Japan; Nepal; Senegal; West Germany; Yugoslavia; Zambia

United Nations Security Council resolution 619 was a resolution adopted unanimously on 9 August 1988 by the United Nations. The resolution came after recalling Resolution 598 (1987) and approving a report by the Secretary-General Javier Pérez de Cuéllar on the implementation of paragraph 2 of Resolution 598.

The Council therefore decided to establish the United Nations Iran–Iraq Military Observer Group for an initial period of six months to monitor the ceasefire between Iran and Iraq at the end of their conflict.

== See also ==
- Iran–Iraq relations
- Iran–Iraq War
- List of United Nations Security Council Resolutions 601 to 700 (1987–1991)
- Resolutions 479, 514, 522, 540, 552, 582, 598, 612, 616 and 620
