= United Nations Security Council Resolution 612 =

UN Security Council Resolution 612
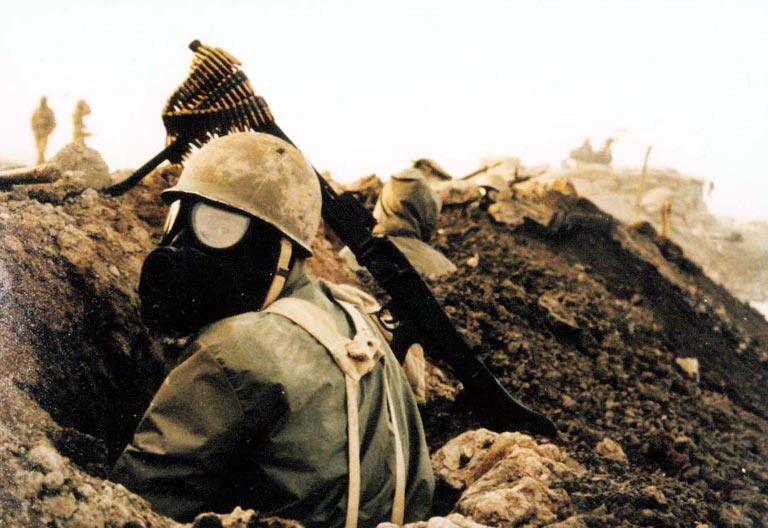
- Iranian soldier wearing a gas mask during the war
- Date: 9 May 1988
- Meeting no.: 2,812
- Code: S/RES/612 (Document)
- Subject: Iran–Iraq
- Voting summary: 15 voted for; None voted against; None abstained
- Result: Adopted

Security Council composition
- Permanent members: China; France; Soviet Union; United Kingdom; United States
- Non-permanent members: Algeria; Argentina; Brazil; Italy; Japan; Nepal; Senegal; West Germany; Yugoslavia; Zambia

United Nations Security Council Resolution 612 was adopted unanimously on 9 May 1988. After considering a report by the Special Mission that was dispatched by the Secretary-General to investigate the alleged chemical warfare that had been occurring in the Iran–Iraq War, the council confirmed the use of chemical weapons and issued a condemnation on the grounds that the usage of these weapons ran contrary to states' obligations under the Geneva Protocol.

The council reaffirmed the urgency of the strict observance of the Geneva Protocol, expecting both sides to refrain from the future use of chemical weapons, in spite of the fact that only Iraqi chemical weapons had been deployed. It also urged United Nations member states to continue to apply or establish strict control of chemical products in exports to both Iran and Iraq, expressing the council's desire to further review the situation.

== See also ==
- Iran–Iraq relations
- Iran–Iraq War
- List of United Nations Security Council Resolutions 601 to 700 (1987–1991)
- Resolutions 479, 514, 522, 540, 552, 582, 598, 616, 619 and 620
