= United Nations Security Council Resolution 616 =

UN Security Council Resolution 616
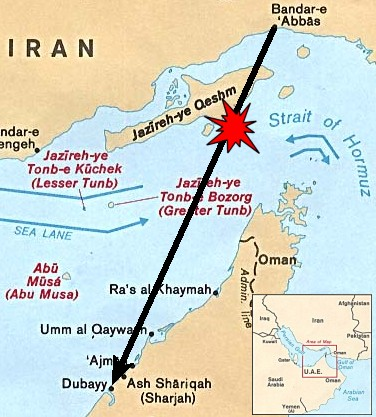
- Location of incident in the Strait of Hormuz
- Date: 20 July 1988
- Meeting no.: 2,821
- Code: S/RES/616 (Document)
- Subject: Islamic Republic of Iran-United States Of America
- Voting summary: 15 voted for; None voted against; None abstained
- Result: Adopted

Security Council composition
- Permanent members: China; France; Soviet Union; United Kingdom; United States
- Non-permanent members: Algeria; Argentina; Brazil; Italy; Japan; Nepal; Senegal; West Germany; Yugoslavia; Zambia

United Nations Security Council resolution 616, adopted unanimously on 20 July 1988, after hearing representations from the Islamic Republic of Iran, the Council expressed its distress at the downing of Iran Air Flight 655 over the Strait of Hormuz by a missile from the United States Navy cruiser USS Vincennes during the conflict between Iran and Iraq.

The Council went on to express its condolences to the victims of the incident and welcomed a decision by the International Civil Aviation Organization, at the request of Iran, to begin an immediate investigation into the incident. It also welcomed announcements by both Iran and the United States of their cooperation with the investigation.

Resolution 616 urged all parties to the Convention on International Civil Aviation in 1944 to fully observe the rules and practices concerning the safety of civil aviation. It also reminded Iran and Iraq to fully implement Resolution 598 as the only just and durable basis for a settlement of the Iran–Iraq War.

== See also ==
- Iran–Iraq relations
- Iran–Iraq War
- Iran – United States relations
- List of United Nations Security Council Resolutions 601 to 700 (1987–1991)
- Resolutions 479, 514, 522, 540, 552, 582, 598, 612, 619 and 620
