= United Nations Security Council Resolution 540 =

UN Security Council Resolution 540
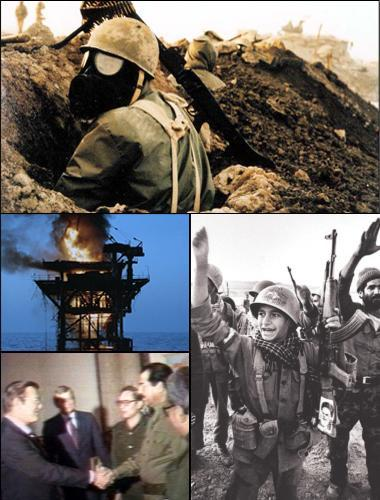
- Iran–Iraq War
- Date: 31 October 1983
- Meeting no.: 2,493
- Code: S/RES/540 (Document)
- Subject: Iran–Iraq
- Voting summary: 12 voted for; None voted against; 3 abstained
- Result: Adopted

Security Council composition
- Permanent members: China; France; Soviet Union; United Kingdom; United States
- Non-permanent members: Guyana; Jordan; Malta; Netherlands; Nicaragua; Pakistan; Poland; Togo; Zaire; Zimbabwe

United Nations Security Council resolution 540, adopted on 31 October 1983, noting the report of the Secretary-General and the increased cooperation from the governments of Iran and Iraq, the Council requested he continue with the mediation efforts in the region.

Resolution 540 went on to condemn all acts in violation of the Geneva Conventions of 1949, affirming the right to free navigation in international waters. It also requested the Secretary-General Javier Pérez de Cuéllar continue in his efforts to find a way to end hostilities between the two countries and urged Iran, Iraq and other Member States to refrain from actions that could destabilise the region.

The resolution was adopted by 12 votes to none, with three abstentions from Malta, Nicaragua and Pakistan.

== See also ==
- Iran–Iraq relations
- Iran–Iraq War
- List of United Nations Security Council Resolutions 501 to 600 (1982–1987)
- Resolutions 479, 514, 522, 552, 582, 588, 598, 612, 616, 619 and 620
