= United Nations Security Council Resolution 598 =

United Nations Security Council resolution

UN Security Council Resolution 598
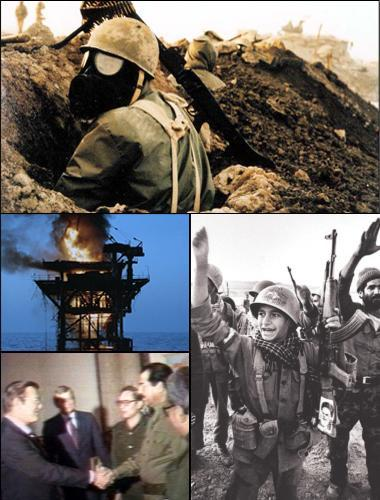
- Iran–Iraq War
- Date: 20 July 1987
- Meeting no.: 2,750
- Code: S/RES/598 (Document)
- Subject: Iran–Iraq
- Voting summary: 15 voted for; None voted against; None abstained
- Result: Adopted

Security Council composition
- Permanent members: China; France; Soviet Union; United Kingdom; United States
- Non-permanent members: Argentina; Bulgaria; Congo; Ghana; Italy; Japan; United Arab Emirates; Venezuela; West Germany; Zambia

United Nations Security Council resolution 598 S/RES/0598 (1987), (UNSC resolution 598) adopted unanimously on 20 July 1987, after recalling Resolution 582 and 588, called for an immediate ceasefire between Iran and Iraq and the repatriation of prisoners of war, and for both sides to withdraw to the international border. The resolution requested Secretary-General Javier Pérez de Cuéllar to dispatch a team of observers to monitor the ceasefire while a permanent settlement was reached to end the conflict.

Iraq quickly accepted the resolution, but Iran refused to accept its terms until nearly a year after its adoption. Famously, Ayatollah Ruhollah Khomeini felt that accepting the resolution was "more deadly than drinking from a poisoned chalice". The resolution finally became effective on 8 August 1988, ending all combat operations between the two countries and the Iran–Iraq War.

== Resolution and initial reactions ==
The Security Council had unanimously adopted resolutions against the Iran-Iraq War twice in 1986, in resolutions 582 and 588. However, neither resolution was implemented by the warring parties. Resolution 598 was drafted in the wake of a report compiled at the behest of the Secretary-General which found that Iraq had used chemical weapons against Iranian troops. Unlike the previous two resolutions, resolution 598 was adopted under Chapter VII of the UN Charter, meaning that non-compliance could result in economic or military intervention. On 20 July, the Security Council invited Ismat Kittani, representative of Iraq, to a discussion of the war as a non-voting member. Its resolution, passed after this discussion, reaffirmed resolution 582 and demanded an immediate ceasefire and requested UN supervision of said ceasefire among other provisions.

Two days after the resolution was issued, Iraq accepted it, but Iran refused to. Then-President Ali Khamenei stated that the resolution was the result of pro-Iraqi American pressure on the Security Council, and Supreme Leader Khomeini declared that, as final victory in the war was imminent, accepting a ceasefire would be tantamount to treason. In September 1987, Khamenei flew to New York to attend the General Assembly and deliver a speech. Prior to the speech, American President Ronald Reagan asked for an unambiguous answer on the resolution from Khamenei; should Khamenei's answer be negative, the United States would have no choice but to implement sanctions against Iran. In his speech, delivered on September 21, Khamenei reiterated that Iran was opposed to a ceasefire, and intended to "punish" Iraq's aggression.

Despite Iran's refusal to accept, the US Navy, the French Navy and the British Navy as well as other navies local to the Persian Gulf enforced the resolution at sea. In an interview on 4 October 1987 aboard the flagship of the US forces, USS La Salle, Rear Admiral Harold Bernsen said "Of course we talk with them (the other navies), and we cooperate, but we don't have a joint command, what I would call a combined or coordinated military operation."

By the Second Battle of al-Faw in spring 1988, Iran began to worry about the tenability of the war. IRGC Commander-in-Chief Mohsen Rezaee delivered a "shocking" assessment to Khomeini that Iran would only be able to recommence offensive operations after 1992. In his 2015 memoir, Akbar Rafsanjani recounted that, by early summer 1988, the sentiment in Tehran was that continuation of the war was "no longer expedient". Khomeini remained resistant, but on July 15th convened a meeting and announced his begrudging acceptance of peace citing the assessment of Iranian commanders that a victory within the next five years was impossible. Iran accepted in a 17 July letter to the secretary-general, and on the same night, the news was broadcast to the Iranian people.

Happy are those who have departed through martyrdom. Unhappy am I that I still survive.… Taking this decision is more deadly than drinking from a poisoned chalice. I submitted myself to Allah's will and took this drink for His satisfaction.

— Ruhollah Khomeini, 19 July 1987

On July 19th, in a public pronouncement on the one-year anniversary of the 1987 Mecca massacre, Khomeini spoke of Iran's acceptance of the resolution. Khomeini's statement that accepting the resolution was "more deadly than drinking from a poisoned chalice" (precise translations vary) became one of his most memorable and enduring remarks.

According to Rafsanjani's son, Khomeini desired to step down as supreme leader after his acceptance of the resolution; Rafsanjani attempted to sign the decision and thus take responsibility himself, but was rebuffed. Khomeini nonetheless would remain Supreme Leader until his death on 3 June 1989.

Iran's withdrawal from Iraqi territory was chaotic and bungled. War-weary Iranian soldiers laid down their arms upon hearing the news (despite the fact that the resolution was yet to be implemented), allowing Iraqi and MEK forces to make late gains. On 24 July, Khomeini ordered the creation of a drumhead "special war tribunal" tasked with the execution of officers who were responsible for territorial and military losses. Negotiations began in New York on 26 July as fighting continued.

== Implementation and aftermath ==
Resolution 598 became effective on 8 August 1988. A date of ceasefire was set for 3 AM on 20 August. Iranian forces withdrew from Iraqi territory, and vice versa. UN peacekeepers belonging to the UNIIMOG mission took the field, remaining on the Iran–Iraq border until 1991. Some Iraqi forces, however, remained on small parts of Iranian territory, they were only evacuated on the eve of the Iraqi invasion of Kuwait. This evacuation was the final restoration of the status quo ante bellum, according to the 1975 borders.

In accordance with paragraph 6 of the resolution, a Belgian delegation was selected to ascertain responsibility for the conflict. In a report delivered on December 9, 1991 (following the UN-condemned invasion of Kuwait and the beginning of the Gulf War), the delegation identified Iraq as the aggressor. Paragraph 7 of the resolution recognized the necessity of reconstruction and international monetary assistance dedicated to it. Iran understood the paragraph as mandating war reparations, however, neither an international fund dedicated to reconstruction nor outright war reparations ever materialized. As peace talks stalled shortly after the ceasefire, Iran and Iraq remain in an official state of ceasefire and the war's end was never formalized by a treaty.

== See also ==
- Iran–Iraq relations
  - Iran–Iraq War
- List of United Nations Security Council Resolutions 501 to 600 (1982–1987)
- Resolutions 479, 514, 522, 540, 552, 582, 612, 616, 619 and 620
