= United Nations Security Council Resolution 620 =

UN Security Council Resolution 620
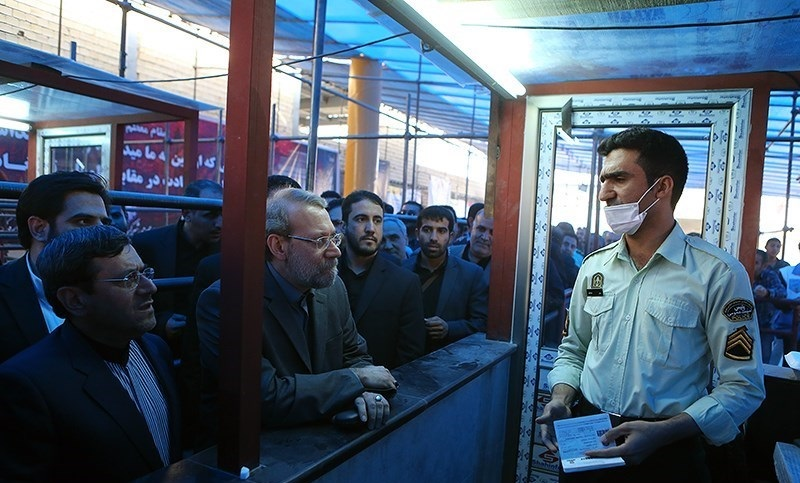
- Iran-Iraq border
- Date: 26 August 1988
- Meeting no.: 2,825
- Code: S/RES/620 (Document)
- Subject: Iran–Iraq
- Voting summary: 15 voted for; None voted against; None abstained
- Result: Adopted

Security Council composition
- Permanent members: China; France; Soviet Union; United Kingdom; United States
- Non-permanent members: Algeria; Argentina; Brazil; Italy; Japan; Nepal; Senegal; West Germany; Yugoslavia; Zambia

United Nations Security Council resolution 620, adopted unanimously on 26 August 1988, after recalling Resolution 612 (1988) which found evidence of the use of chemical warfare between Iran and Iraq, the Council again condemned the use of such weapons, in violation of the Geneva Protocol.

The Council then encouraged the Secretary-General Javier Pérez de Cuéllar to carry out investigations into allegations of the use of chemical and biological weapons by any Member State that may constitute a violation of the Geneva Protocol of 1925.

Resolution 620 also called upon Member States to strengthen, establish or continue applying strict control on chemical products, especially when it is suspected they may be used in chemical weapons in violation of international obligations. It also decided to consider and take into account any investigations by the Secretary-General in order to produce appropriate and effective measures in accordance with the United Nations Charter should there be any future use of chemical weapons in violation of international law by whomever and wherever they are committed.

== See also ==
- Iran–Iraq relations
- Iran–Iraq War
- List of United Nations Security Council Resolutions 601 to 700 (1987–1991)
- Resolutions 479, 514, 522, 540, 552, 582, 598, 612, 616 and 619
