= Iran–Iraq relations =

- Iran: Iraq

Diplomatic mission
- Iranian embassy, Baghdad: Iraqi embassy, Tehran

The two sovereign states of Iran and Iraq maintain diplomatic and foreign relations.

Both states have history that extends for millennia into the past. Iran and Iraq share a long border (the longest border for both nations) and an ancient cultural and religious heritage. In antiquity, Iraq was at times ruled by empires of Iranian origin, including the Achaemenids, Parthians, Sasanians, Buyids and Safavids; however, Persian populations in Iraq were limited, and imperial rule did not involve large-scale population replacement.

Modern relations between the two nations turned increasingly negative following the 14 July Revolution in Iraq in 1958, and subsequent overthrow of the Hashemite Monarchy which resulted in the country withdrawing from the Baghdad Pact. The Ba'ath Party gained power in Iraq in the 1960s, taking a more aggressive stance on border disputes. In the aftermath of the Iranian Revolution in 1979, Saddam Hussein launched an invasion of Iran over border disputes and a desire to gain control of oil-rich areas in Iran's territory. The conflict lasted for eight years and ended in a stalemate. Iran later opposed the American-led coalition against Iraq in 1991.

The fall of Saddam Hussein in 2003 and the eventual rise to power by pro-Iranian Shia factions (i.e. Islamic Dawa Party and Islamic Supreme Council of Iraq) led to the normalization of relations between the two countries. Since 2003, Iraq has allowed Shia Muslims from Iran to make the pilgrimage to holy Shia sites in Iraq. In March 2008, Iranian president Mahmoud Ahmadinejad became the first Iranian Head of State to visit Iraq since Iran's 1979 Islamic revolution. Former Iraqi prime minister Nouri al-Maliki has made several state visits to Iran since 2006 and expressed sympathy with Iran over its nuclear energy program. Iran has since become Iraq's largest trading partner. Iran and Iraq are very close allies supporting each other against the Islamic State. The relationship between the two countries is strong in part because both governments are dominated by Shi'ite Muslims. Increasing influence of Tehran in Iraqi politics has led to civilians protesting the foreign involvement and presence of Iran-backed militias harassing and attacking citizens.

Iran has an embassy in Baghdad and four consulates general in Basra, Sulaymaniyah, Erbil and Karbala. Iraq has an embassy in Tehran and three consulates general in Kermanshah, Ahvaz and Mashhad. On 7 September 2018, Iraqi citizens set the Iranian embassy on fire as a part of a series of protests and arson against the foreign power seen as becoming too influential in local domestic politics. On 27 November 2019, Iraqi protesters burned down the Iranian consulate in Najaf.

== Country comparison ==
	Islamic Republic of Iran	Republic of Iraq
Coat of Arms		
Flag	Iran	Iraq
Population	92,417,681	46,118,793
Area	1,648,195 km^{2} (636,372 mi^{2})	438,317 km^{2} (169,235 mi^{2})
Population Density	52/km^{2} (130/sq mi)	82.7/km^{2} (214/sq mi)
Capital	Tehran	Baghdad
Largest City	Tehran – 9,039,000 (14,425,000 Metro)	Baghdad – 8,080,012 (8,141,000 Metro)
Government	Unitary presidential theocratic Islamic republic	Federal parliamentary republic
First Leaders	Ruhollah Khomeini; Abolhassan Banisadr	Faisal I Naji Shawkat
Current Leaders	Mojtaba Khamenei; Masoud Pezeshkian	Abdul Latif Rashid; Mohammed Shia' al-Sudani
Official languages	Persian	Arabic and Kurdish
GDP (nominal)	US$356.513 billion ($4,074 per capita)	US$258.020 billion ($5,670 per capita)

== History ==
=== Antiquity ===
==== Akkadian Empire ====
Sargon of Akkad (r. 2334–2279 BC) was an Akkadian king who conquered Sumer and was the reason of moving the power from Southern Mesopotamia (southern Iraq) to central Mesopotamia (central Iraq). Sargon's vast empire is known to have extended from Elam to the Mediterranean sea, including Mesopotamia, parts of modern-day Iran and Syria, and possibly parts of Anatolia and the Arabian Peninsula.

==== Sumerian Empire ====
The Third Dynasty of Ur (2119–2004 BC), or 'Neo-Sumerian Empire' was a Sumerian ruling dynasty based in the city of Ur (southern Iraq). The Third Dynasty of Ur came to preeminent power in Mesopotamia after several centuries of Akkadian and Gutian rule. It controlled the cities of Isin, Larsa and Eshnunna, and extended from the Mediterranean (north Syrian) coast to the Persian Gulf and Western Iran. A salient feature of the dynasty is its establishment of the earliest known law code after the Code of Urukagina—the Code of Ur-Nammu.

During King Shulgi's reign, many significant changes occurred. He took steps to centralize and standardize the procedures of the empire. He is credited with standardizing administrative processes, archival documentation, the tax system, and the national calendar.

The last Sumerian dynasty ended after an Elamite invasion in 2004 BC. From this point on, with the growing Akkadian presence in the region, the Sumerian language declined, after more than three thousand years of cultural identity, as the population increasingly adopted Akkadian. Future Babylonian kings carried the title 'King of Sumer and Akkad', however, for some fourteen centuries to come. The title would also be claimed by Cyrus of Persia in the 6th century BC.

==== Assyrian Empire ====
The Neo-Assyrian Empire (934–609 BC) was a multi-ethnic state composed of many peoples and tribes of different origins. During this period, Aramaic was made an official language of the empire, alongside the Akkadian language. In the preceding Middle Assyrian period (14th to 10th century BC), Assyria had been a minor kingdom of northern Mesopotamia (northern Iraq), competing for dominance with its southern Mesopotamian rival Babylonia.

In 647 BC, the Assyrian king Ashurbanipal leveled the Elamite capital city of Susa during a war in which the inhabitants apparently participated on an opposing side. A tablet unearthed in 1854 by Austen Henry Layard in Nineveh reveals Ashurbanipal as an "avenger", seeking retribution for the humiliations the Elamites had inflicted on the Mesopotamians over the centuries.

Assyrian rule succumbed to Babylonia with the Fall of Nineveh in 612 BC.

==== Babylonian Empire ====
In the golden age of Babylon, Nabopolassar was intent on conquering from the pharaoh Necho II (who was still hoping to restore Assyrian power) the western provinces of Syria, and to this end dispatched his son Nebuchadnezzar II with a powerful army westward. In the ensuing Battle of Carchemish in 605 BC, the Egyptian army was defeated and driven back, and Syria and Phoenicia were brought under the sway of Babylon. Nabopolassar died in August of that year, and Nebuchadrezzar II returned home to Babylon to ascend to the throne.

After the defeat of the Cimmerians and Scythians, all of Nebuchadrezzar's expeditions were directed westwards, although a powerful neighbour lay to the North; the cause of this was that a wise political marriage with Amytis of Babylon, the daughter of the Median king, had ensured a lasting peace between the two empires.

Though Babylonia was annexed by the rising Persian Empire in 539 BC, the Sumero–Akkadian culture of the Mesopotamians significantly influenced the succeeding empires of the Indo-Iranian tribes of the Medes and the Persians.

==== Achaemenid Iranian Empire ====
In 539 BC, Persian forces led by Cyrus The Great defeated Babylonian forces at the Battle of Opis, east of the Tigris. Cyrus entered Babylon and presented himself as a traditional Mesopotamian monarch, restoring temples and releasing political prisoners. Upon assuming power, Cyrus appointed provincial governors (the predecessors of the Persian satraps), and he required from his subjects only tribute and obedience. Following Cyrus's death, a brief period of Babylonian unrest ensued that climaxed in 522 B.C. with a general rebellion of Iranian colonies.

Of the four residences of the Achaemenids named by Herodotus—Ecbatana, Pasargadae or Persepolis, Susa and Babylon—the last [situated in Iraq] was maintained as their most important capital, the fixed winter quarters, the central office of bureaucracy, exchanged only in the heat of summer for some cool spot in the highlands. Under the Seleucids and the Parthians the site of the Mesopotamian capital moved a little to the north on the Tigris—to Seleucia and Ctesiphon. It is indeed symbolic that these new foundations were built from the bricks of ancient Babylon, just as later Baghdad, a little further upstream, was built out of the ruins of the Sassanian double city of Seleucia-Ctesiphon.

— Iranologist Ehsan Yarshater, The Cambridge History of Iran,

Between 520 and 485 BC, the Iranian leader, Darius the Great, reimposed political stability in Babylon and ushered in a period of great economic prosperity. His greatest achievements were in road building, which significantly improved communication among the provinces, and in organizing an efficient bureaucracy. Darius's death in 485 B.C. was followed by a period of decay that led to a major Babylonian rebellion in 482 B.C. The Iranians violently quelled the uprising, and the repression that followed severely damaged Babylon's economic infrastructure.

The first Iranian kings to rule Iraq followed Mesopotamian land-management practices conscientiously. Between 485 B.C. and the conquest by Alexander the Great in 331 B.C., however, very little in Babylon was repaired and few of its once-great cities remained intact. Trade also was greatly reduced during this period. The established trade route from Sardis to Susa did not traverse Babylonia, and the Iranian rulers, themselves much closer to the Orient, were able to monopolize trade from India and other eastern points. As a result, Babylonia and Assyria, which together formed the ninth satrapy of the Persian Empire, became economically isolated and impoverished. Their poverty was exacerbated by the extremely high taxes levied on them: they owed the Iranian crown 1,000 talents of silver a year, in addition to having to meet the extortionate demands of the local administrators, and they were responsible for feeding the Iranian court for four months every year.

==== Seleucid Empire ====
By the fourth century B.C., nearly all of Babylon opposed the Achaemenids. Thus, when the Iranian forces stationed in Babylon surrendered to Alexander in 331 B.C. all of Babylonia hailed him as a liberator. Alexander quickly won Babylonian favor when, unlike the Achaemenids, he displayed respect for such Babylonian traditions as the worship of their chief god, Marduk. Alexander also proposed ambitious schemes for Babylon. He planned to establish one of the two seats of his empire there and to make the Euphrates navigable all the way to the Persian Gulf, where he planned to build a great port. Alexander's grandiose plans, however, never came to fruition. Returning from an expedition to the Indus River, he died in Babylon; most probably from malaria contracted there in 323 B.C. at the age of 32. In the politically chaotic period after Alexander's death, his generals fought for and divided up his empire.

==== Parthian Empire ====
In 126 B.C., the Parthians, a nomadic Iranian people led by the Arsacid Dynasty, captured the Tigris–Euphrates river valley. The Parthians were able to control all trade between the East and the Greco–Roman world. For the most part, they chose to retain existing social institutions and to live in cities that already existed. Mesopotamia was immeasurably enriched by this, the mildest of all foreign occupations of the region. The population of Mesopotamia was enormously enlarged, Iranians, and Aramaeans. With the exception of the Roman occupation under Trajan (A.D. 98–117) and Septimius Severus (A.D. 193–211), the Arsacids ruled until a new force of native Iranian rulers, the Persian Sassanids, conquered the region in A.D. 227.

==== Sassanid Iranian Empire ====
During the time of the Sassanid Empire, from the 3rd century to the 7th century, the major part of Iraq was called in Persian Del-e Īrānshahr (lit. "the heart of Iran"), and its metropolis Ctesiphon (not far from present-day Baghdad) functioned for more than 800 years as the capital city of Iran.

According to Sassanian documents, Persians distinguished two kinds of land within their empire: [the heartlands] "Īrān", and [the colonies] "Anīrān" ("non-Īrān"). Iraq was considered to be part of Īrān [the heartlands]. As Wilhelm Eilers observes: "For the Sassanians, too [as it was for the Parthians], the lowlands of Iraq constituted the heart of their dominions". This shows that Iraq was not simply part of the Persian Empire—it was the heart of Persia.

=== Medieval era ===
==== Abbasid Caliphate ====
The Abbasid Caliphate of circa 750 A.D. was the second of the two great Islamic caliphates. It was ruled by the Abbasid dynasty of caliphs, who built their capital in Baghdad (Iraq). The Abbasids had depended heavily on the support of Persians in their overthrow of the Umayyads. Abu al-'Abbas' successor, al-Mansur, moved their capital from Damascus to the new city of Baghdad and welcomed non-Arab Muslims to their court. During the reign of its first seven caliphs, Baghdad became a center of power where Arab and Iranian cultures mingled to produce a blaze of philosophical, scientific, and literary glory. This era is remembered throughout the Muslim world, and by Iraqis in particular, as the pinnacle of the Islamic past.

Abbasid Iraq eventually became part of Buyid Iran as the Buyid Emirate of Baghdad. After the Seljuk invasion, the Abbasid Caliphate regained a degree of independence. During the reign of Caliph Al-Nasir, Abbasid Iraq expanded into Iran.

==== Late Middle Ages ====
Iran and Iraq both fell to the Mongols during the 13th century. In the 14th century, there emerged the Mongol Jalayirid sultanate which controlled Iraq and parts of Iran. They were later displaced by the Timurids, Qara Qoyunlu, and then the Aq Qoyunlu of Iran, however the area centered around Basra was always locally dominated by semi-autonomous Arab tribes like the Al-Mughamis, Musha'sha', and Muntafiq. Under them, the Emirate of Basra in southern Iraq often challenged the dynasties of Iran, until the Safavids subdued Basra in the early 16th century.

=== Early modern era ===
Despite decades of Iranian suzerainty, the Muntafiq remained autonomous and allied with the Ottomans and Portuguese. Iran briefly reoccupied Muntafiq Iraq between 1623 and 1639. By 1667, the Afrasiyab dynasty became co-rulers of southern Iraq with the Muntafiq while Ottoman suzerainty was disrespected. In 1667 the pasha of southern Iraq offered to submit to Iran, but the Safavids had no wish to antagonize the Ottomans. Similarly, the Iranians suppressed a Muntafiq revolt against Ottoman suzerainty in 1697, and returned Basra to the Ottomans in 1701. Nonetheless, Iraq was always a place of great importance to Iranians because of the abundant Shia shrines.

In the early 18th century, Iraq became unified under the Mamluks, and they assisted the Ottomans with their invasion of Iran in the 1720s. In turn, the Iranians invaded Iraq three times between 1730 and 1776; they failed to capture Mosul and only briefly occupied Basra after a long siege. Both countries had conflicting interests over the Kurdish emirates. In 1802, the Shah of Iran, Fath Ali Shah, criticized the Mamluk governor of Iraq for his inability to counter the anti-Shia Wahhabis. Iran and Iraq invaded each other again during the 1820s, before the Ottomans ended Iraqi autonomy in 1831.

=== Modern era ===
==== Pahlavi era ====
Since the Ottoman–Persian Wars of the 16th and 17th centuries, Iran (known as "Persia" prior to 1935) and the Ottomans fought over Iraq (then known as Mesopotamia) and full control of the Shatt al-Arab until the signing of the Treaty of Zuhab in 1639 which established the final borders between the two countries. The Shatt al-Arab was considered an important channel for both states' oil exports, and in 1937, Iran and the newly independent Iraq signed a treaty to settle the dispute. In the same year, Iran and Iraq both joined the Treaty of Saadabad, and relations between the two states remained good for decades afterwards.

The 1937 treaty recognised the Iran–Iraq border to be along the low-water mark on the Shatt al-Arab's eastern side, except at Abadan and Khorramshahr, where the frontier ran along the thalweg (deepest part of the river valley). This gave Iraq control of most of the waterway and required Iran to pay tolls whenever its ships used it.

In 1955, both nations joined the Baghdad Pact. However, the overthrow of the Hashemites in Iraq in 1958 brought a nationalist government to power which promptly abandoned the pact. On 18 December 1959, Iraq's new leader, General Abd al-Karim Qasim, declared: "We do not wish to refer to the history of Arab tribes residing in al-Ahwaz and Mohammareh [Khorramshahr]. The Ottomans handed over Mohammareh, which was part of Iraqi territory, to Iran." The Iraqi government's dissatisfaction with Iran's possession of the oil-rich Khuzestan Province, which the Iraqis called Arabistan and had a large Arabic-speaking population, was not limited to rhetorical statements. Iraq began supporting secessionist movements in Khuzestan, and raised the issue of its territorial claims at an Arab League meeting, though unsuccessfully.

Iraq showed reluctance in fulfilling existing agreements with Iran—especially after Egyptian President Gamal Abdel Nasser's death in 1970 and the Iraqi Ba'ath Party's rise which took power in a 1968 coup, leading Iraq to take on the self-appointed role of "leader of the Arab world". At the same time, by the late 1960s, the build-up of Iranian power under Shah Mohammad Reza Pahlavi, who had gone on a military spending spree, led Iran to take a more assertive stance in the region.

In April 1969, Iran abrogated the 1937 treaty over the Shatt al-Arab, and as such, ceased paying tolls to Iraq when its ships used the waterway. The Shah justified his move by arguing that almost all river borders around the world ran along the thalweg, and by claiming that because most of the ships that used the waterway were Iranian, the 1937 treaty was unfair to Iran. Iraq threatened war over the Iranian move, but when, on 24 April 1969, an Iranian tanker escorted by Iranian warships sailed down the river, Iraq—being the militarily weaker state—did nothing. (Joint Operation Arvand)

Iran's abrogation of the treaty marked the beginning of a period of acute Iraqi-Iranian tension that was to last until the 1975 Algiers Agreement. In 1969, Saddam Hussein, Iraq's deputy prime minister, stated: "Iraq's dispute with Iran is in connection with Khuzestan, which is part of Iraq's soil and was annexed to Iran during foreign rule." Soon, Iraqi radio stations began exclusively broadcasting into "Arabistan", encouraging Arabs living in Iran and even Baloch people to revolt against the Shah's government. Basra TV stations began showing Iran's Khuzestan province as part of Iraq's new province of "Nāṣiriyyah" (ناصرية), renaming all of its cities with Arabic names.

In 1971, Iraq (now under Saddam's effective rule) broke diplomatic relations with Iran after claiming sovereignty rights over the islands of Abu Musa, Greater and Lesser Tunbs in the Persian Gulf following the withdrawal of the British. As retaliation for Iraq's claims to Khuzestan, Iran became the main patron of Iraq's Kurdish rebels in the early 1970s, giving the Iraqi Kurds bases in Iran and arming the Kurdish groups. In addition to Iraq fomenting separatism in Iran's Khuzestan and Balochistan, both states encouraged separatist activities by Kurdish nationalists in the other state. From March 1974 to March 1975, Iran and Iraq fought border wars over Iran's support of Iraqi Kurds. In 1975, the Iraqis launched an offensive into Iran using tanks, though the Iranians defeated them. Several other attacks took place; however, Iran had the world's fifth most powerful military at the time and easily defeated the Iraqis with its air force. As a result, Iraq decided against continuing the war, choosing instead to make concessions to Tehran to end the Kurdish rebellion.

In the 1975 Algiers Agreement, Iraq made territorial concessions—including the Shatt al-Arab waterway—in exchange for normalised relations. In return for Iraq recognising that the frontier on the waterway ran along the entire thalweg, Iran ended its support of Iraq's Kurdish guerrillas. Iraqis viewed the Algiers Agreement as humiliating. However, the agreement meant the end of Iranian and American support for the Peshmerga, who were defeated by Iraq's government in a short campaign that claimed 20,000 lives. The British journalist Patrick Brogan wrote that "the Iraqis celebrated their victory in the usual manner, by executing as many of the rebels as they could lay their hands on."

The relationship between the governments of Iran and Iraq briefly improved in 1978, when Iranian agents in Iraq discovered plans for a pro-Soviet coup d'état against Iraq's government. When informed of this plot, Saddam ordered the execution of dozens of his army's officers and in a sign of reconciliation, expelled Ruhollah Khomeini, an exiled leader of clerical opposition to the Shah, from Iraq. Despite this, Saddam merely considered the Algiers Agreement to be a truce, rather than a definite settlement, and waited for an opportunity to contest it.

According to Mohsen Milani, "From 1921, when Britain installed Faysal Ibn Hussein as the king of the newly formed Iraq ... until 2003 ... Iraq was Iran's most hostile neighbor." Their competition was especially fierce after the 1968 Baathist coup and the concurrent withdrawal of British forces from the Persian Gulf region. Also in 1921, the British played a role in the 1921 Persian coup d'etat, which led to the rise of the Pahlavi dynasty as rulers of Iran in 1925. Reza Shah's Iran was in economic trouble, and he sought good ties with his neighbors in the 1920s—including Iraq. Iran and Iraq were staunchly anticommunist and pursued pro-West policies. They also cooperated in preventing the emergence of a Kurdish state.

Iraq, supported by other Arab states, resisted Iranian influence under the Shah in the 1970s (which was backed by the United States as part of the Twin Pillars policy). This took the form of supporting insurgencies against the Shah in Khuzestan Province and Iranian Balochistan. The Shah, in turn, attempted to organize a coup against Saddam Hussein in 1971 and helped Sultan Qaboos of Oman quell an Iraqi-backed rebellion. He also backed a Kurdish rebellion led by Mustafa Barzani.

In 1975, Iran and Iraq signed a demarcation agreement stemming from the Kurdish rebellion, which remained in stalemate.

==== Iran–Iraq War ====
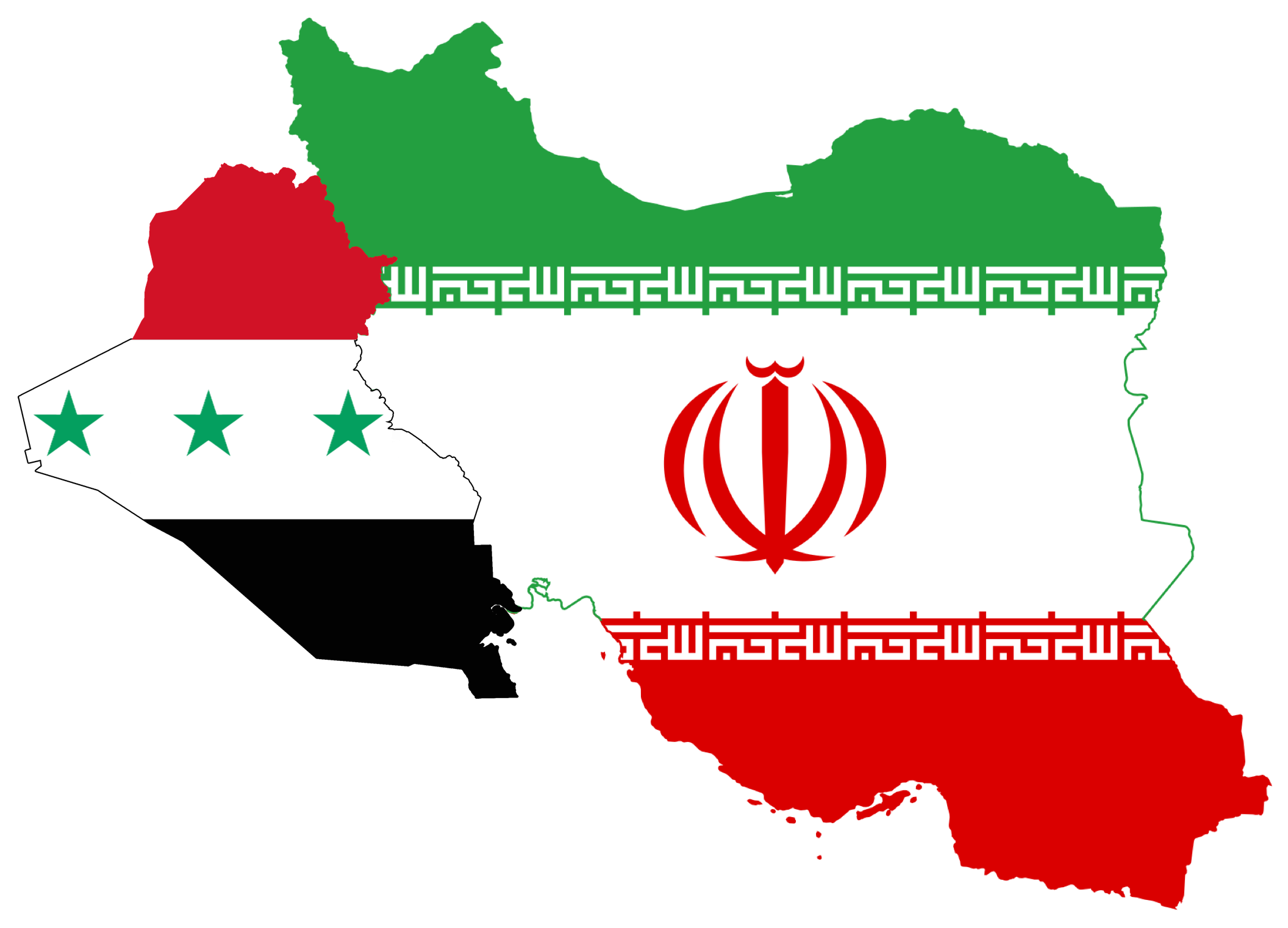
Iraq under the rule of Ba'ath Party was hostile to Iranian expansionist policies.

The Iranian Revolution in 1979 drastically changed Iran–Iraq relations for 24 years.

War broke out between Iraq and Iran in September 1980. During the war, Iraq used chemical weapons and violence against Iraqi Kurds and Marsh Arabs, who were accused of colluding with Iran. Eight years of fighting left around 600,000 dead and caused huge disasters for both sides, thereby grimly blistering ties between Tehran and Baghdad. The United Nations (UN) issued Resolution 598 in July 1987, demanding an unconditional ceasefire between the two nations. Both nations adopted the resolution ending the war in August 1988.

=== Post-war reconciliation ===
Although Iran condemned the Iraqi invasion of Kuwait, the former enemies reestablished diplomatic relations in October 1990; one month later, Iranian Foreign Minister Ali Akbar Velayati visited Baghdad.

In January 2002, one year before the U.S.-led Iraq War, the bilateral relations improved significantly when an Iranian delegation led by Amir Hussein Zamani visited Iraq for final negotiations to resolve the conflict through talks on issues of prisoners of war and the missing in action.

==== Post-Saddam ====
Leveraging the fact that the regime change targeted a rival power and Shia Muslims accounting for the majority of the population in both countries, the Iranian government used Shia militias to serve its interests during the Iraq War. This culminated in a complex series of events from Iran's aiding U.S. coalition efforts to later involvement in the Iraqi insurgency, in which there were instances of Shia militias fighting both alongside and against the Multi-National Force in Iraq. Organizations that enjoyed large-scale Iranian support included the Badr Corps, as well as Kata'ib Hezbollah, Asa'ib Ahl al-Haq, and the Promised Day Brigade. Since 2007, the United States has employed a "kill or capture" strategy with regard to confronting Iranian operatives in the Iraqi conflict.

Iran then offered assistance to Iraq's post-war reconstruction and bilateral relations began to improve. In May 2005, a transitional government led by Ibrahim al-Jaafari of the pro-Iran Islamist Dawa party was established in Iraq. In mid May, Iranian foreign minister Kamal Kharazi visited Iraq and Jaafari paid a visit to Iran in July. In November, Iraqi president Jalal Talabani visited Iran, becoming the first Iraqi head of state to visit Iran in almost four decades.

Iran–Iraq relations have flourished since 2005 by the exchange of high level visits: Former Iraqi PM Nouri al-Maliki makes frequent visits, along with Jalal Talabani visiting numerous times, to help boost bilateral cooperation in all fields. A conflict occurred in December 2009, when Iraq accused Iran of seizing an oil well on the border.

On April 24, 2011, Iran and Iraq signed an extradition accord. The high-level meeting by the justice ministers of both countries in Tehran followed in the aftermath of a raid by Iraqi forces on Camp Ashraf, home of the People's Mujahedin of Iran (MEK). The MEK is designated as a terrorist organization by Iran and Iraq.

Iran has taken an increasingly salient role within the Iraqi government and security forces since the United States originally withdrew and ISIS rose to power. In Basra alone, there are numerous stories of Iranian militant factions harassing and kidnapping civilians. On September 7, 2018, several months of protest and arson erupted into an attack against the Iranian consulate within Iraq, where it was set ablaze by rocket fire.

On 9 April 2019, a day after the United States placed Iran's IRGC in the list of "Foreign Terrorist Organizations", Iraqi Prime Minister Adel Abdel Mahdi said he had talked to all sides and tried to stop the designation.

In August 2019, Iran seized an Iraqi oil tanker in the Gulf and detained seven sailors for "smuggling fuel for some Arab countries". Iraq denied any connection with the vessel and claimed to investigate the matter. A 2019 article by The New York Times revealed leaked information detailing "years of painstaking work by Iranian spies to co-opt the country's leaders, pay Iraqi agents working for the Americans to switch sides and infiltrate every aspect of Iraq's political, economic and religious life".

On 27 November 2019, Iraqi protesters burned down the Iranian consulate in Najaf.

In April 2022, Iraq and Iran secured an agreement to resume Iranian gas deliveries to Iraq in exchange for Baghdad repaying debts owed to Tehran.

On June 26, 2022, Iraqi Prime Minister Mustafa Al-Kadhimi said in Tehran, a day after traveling to Saudi Arabia in an effort to resurrect negotiations between the regional adversaries to end years of antagonism, that Iran and Iraq had agreed to work toward Middle East stability.

On March 19, 2023, Iran's Supreme National Security Council secretary Ali Shamkhani and Iraq's National Security Advisor Qasim al-Araji signed a border security agreement to not allow armed groups in the Iraqi Kurdish region to launch border-crossing attacks on Iran. The arrangement was prompted by a missile attack from Iran's Revolutionary Guards against Iranian Kurdish groups.

In October 2026, Iraqi authorities closed the al-Sheeb border crossing with Iran until further notice. Agence France-Presse, citing two political sources, reported that the United States was pressing Baghdad to shut additional crossings with Iran as part of a wider campaign of economic pressure on Tehran.

=== Iranian influence over Iraqi Paramilitary Forces ===
Following the rise of ISIS in 2014, Iraq formed the Popular Mobilization Forces (PMF), a coalition of mostly Shiite militias created to bolster the national army's efforts in fighting the jihadist group. While formally recognized as part of Iraq’s security apparatus, several PMF factions have maintained close ties with Iran, receiving funding, training, and political backing from Tehran. These connections have led to growing concern in both Iraqi and international circles regarding the extent of Iranian influence over Iraqi internal affairs. In response to increasing U.S. pressure, the Iraqi government introduced a draft law in March 2025 aimed at restructuring the PMF. The proposed legislation seeks to formalize the chain of command by placing the PMF directly under the authority of the Iraqi Prime Minister, rather than allowing autonomous units to operate under the influence of foreign powers. The bill also includes a mandatory retirement age for senior commanders, a move expected to displace key figures aligned with Iran. The legislative push came after a February 2025 visit by PMF chairman Falih al-Fayyadh to senior Iranian officials, interpreted as an effort to garner Tehran’s support in opposing the reforms.

=== Tishreen Movement ===
In 2019 mass protests broke out in Iraq caused by poor living standards, structural sectarianism in the government and foreign intervention, "No to Iran, no to America" a popular slogan used in the protests. The government, with the help of Iranian-backed militias used lethal force to quell the protests. An opinion poll from that year found that only 16% of Iraqis had a favorable opinion of the Iranian government.

=== Aftermath of 2025-2026 Iranian protests ===
On January 26, 2026, in the aftermath of the 2025–2026 Iranian protests and subsequent 2026 Iran massacres and 2026 Internet blackout in Iran, the Iraqi based militia Kata'ib Hezbollah called for its fighters around the world to prepare to fight on behalf on the Iranian regime.

== Commerce ==
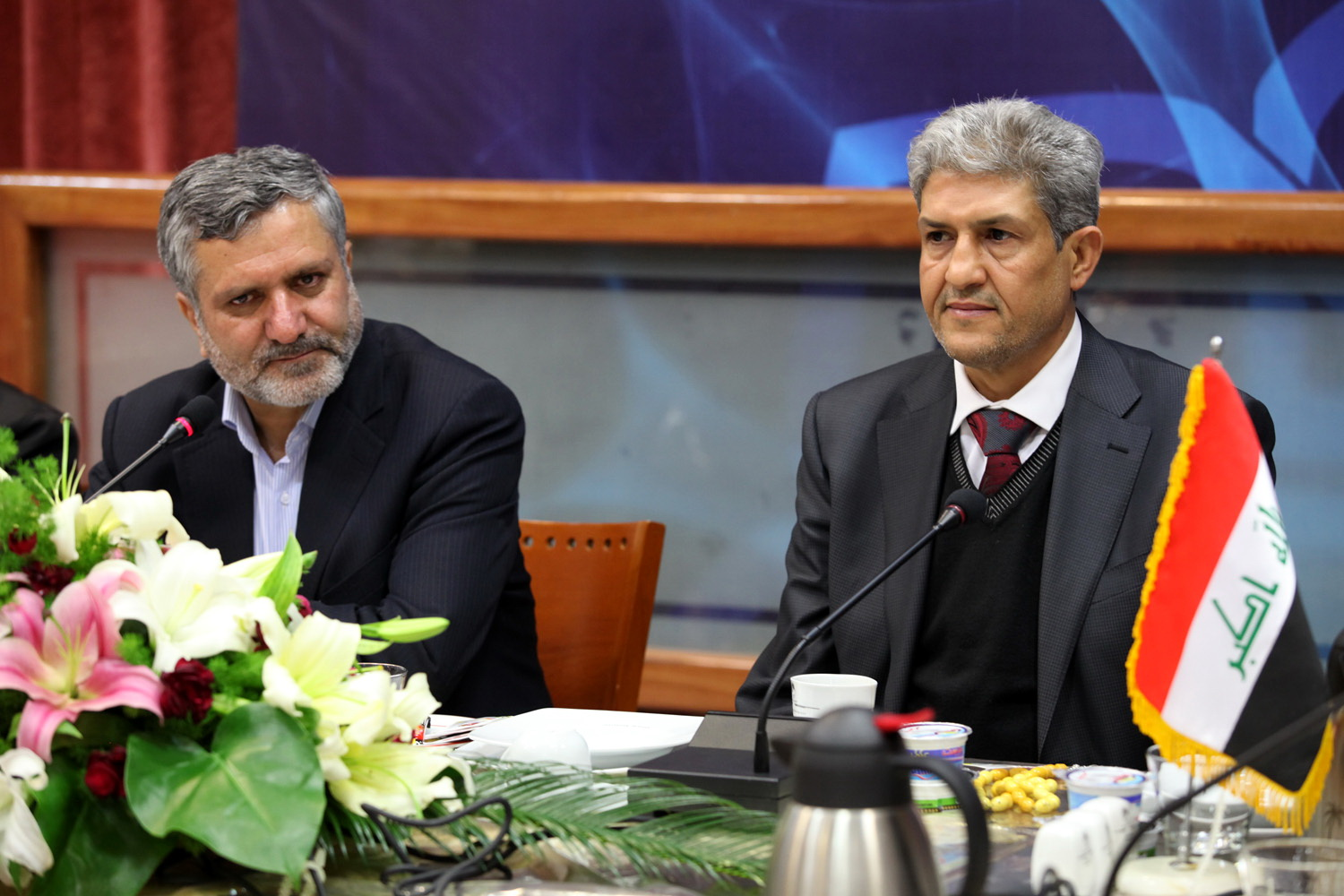
Mayor of Baghdad, Naeem Aboub (right), met with the Mayor of Mashhad.

Iran plays an important role in the Iraqi reconstruction. Iran's non-oil exports to Iraq were valued at $1.8 billion in 2007 and $2.3 billion in 2008. Each month, more than 40,000 Iranians visit Shiite holy sites such as Najaf and Karbala, buying religious souvenirs and supporting the economy through tourism. Iraq imports cars, construction materials, medicine, fruits, spices, fish, air conditioners, office furniture, carpets and apparel from Iran. Basra alone imports $45 million of goods from Iran each year, including carpets, construction materials, fish and spices. Each day, 100 to 150 commercial trucks transport goods from Iran to Iraq through the nearby Shalamcheh border crossing (2008). As of January 2010, the two countries signed over 100 economic and cooperation agreements.

The volume of trade between Iran and Iraq reached $12 billion in 2013. The main areas of trade between the two countries are the construction, food and industrial sectors.

Iraq heavily relies on direct electricity and gas imports from Iran to supply its power grid. In 2025, the U.S. halted the Iraq-Iran electricity waiver putting further stress on regional economies. While direct electricity imports from Iran only make up a few percent, reduced gas imports from Iran have a greater impact as they constitute 40% of the supply. Sanctions on Iran have hindered the development of regional economies and limited the trade between the two nations.

== Resident diplomatic missions ==
- Iran has an embassy in Baghdad and consulates-general in Basra, Erbil, Karbala, Najaf and Sulaymaniyah.
- Iraq has an embassy in Tehran and consulates-general in Ahvaz, Isfahan, Kermanshah and Mashhad.

== See also ==
- Arab–Iran relations
- Iranians in Iraq
- Iraqis in Iran
- Shia crescent
