= Legality of the Iraq War =

21st century international controversy

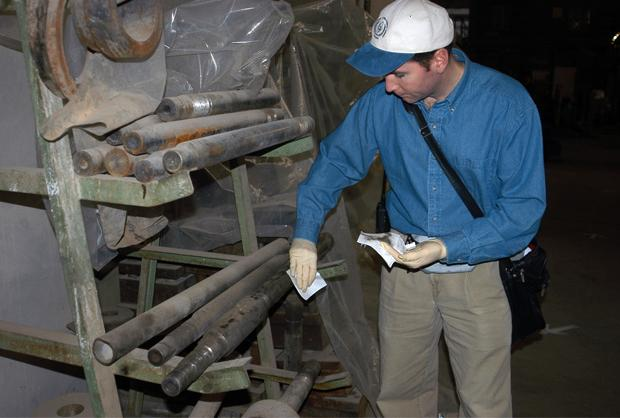
A UN weapons inspector in Iraq

The legality of the Iraq War is a contested topic that spans both domestic and international law. Political leaders in the US and the UK who supported the invasion of Iraq have claimed that the war was legal. However, many legal experts and other world leaders have argued that the war lacked justification and violated the United Nations charter.

In the UK, John Chilcot, chairman of the Iraq Inquiry, concluded that the process of identifying the legal basis for the invasion of Iraq was unsatisfactory and that the actions of the US and the UK undermined the authority of the United Nations. John Prescott, Deputy Prime Minister to Tony Blair, has also argued that the invasion of Iraq lacked legality. In a 2005 paper, Kramer and Michalowski argued that the war "violated the UN Charter and international humanitarian law".

Russian President Vladimir Putin stated that the war was unjustified. In a televised conference before a meeting with the US envoy to Iraq, Putin said that, "The use of force abroad, according to existing international laws, can only be sanctioned by the United Nations. This is the international law. Everything that is done without the UN Security Council's sanction cannot be recognized as fair or justified."

US and UK officials have argued that the invasion was already authorized under existing UN Security Council resolutions regarding the 1991 Gulf War, the subsequent ceasefire (660, 678), and later inspections of Iraqi weapons programs (1441).

Critics of the invasion have challenged these assertions. They argued that an additional Security Council resolution, which the US and UK failed to obtain, would have been necessary to specifically authorize the invasion. In September 2004, then-United Nations Secretary-General Kofi Annan stated, "I have indicated that it is not in accordance with the UN charter. From our point of view and the UN Charter point of view, it [the war] was illegal."

The UN Security Council, as outlined in Article 39 of the UN Charter, has the ability to rule on the legality of the war. It has yet not been asked to do so by any UN member nation. Given that the United States and the United Kingdom have veto power in the Security Council, action by the Security Council is highly improbable even if the issue were to be raised. Despite this, the UN General Assembly (UNGA) may ask the International Court of Justice (ICJ)—"the principal judicial organ of the United Nations" (Article 92)—to give either an 'advisory opinion' or 'judgement' on the legality of the war.

== Legitimacy ==
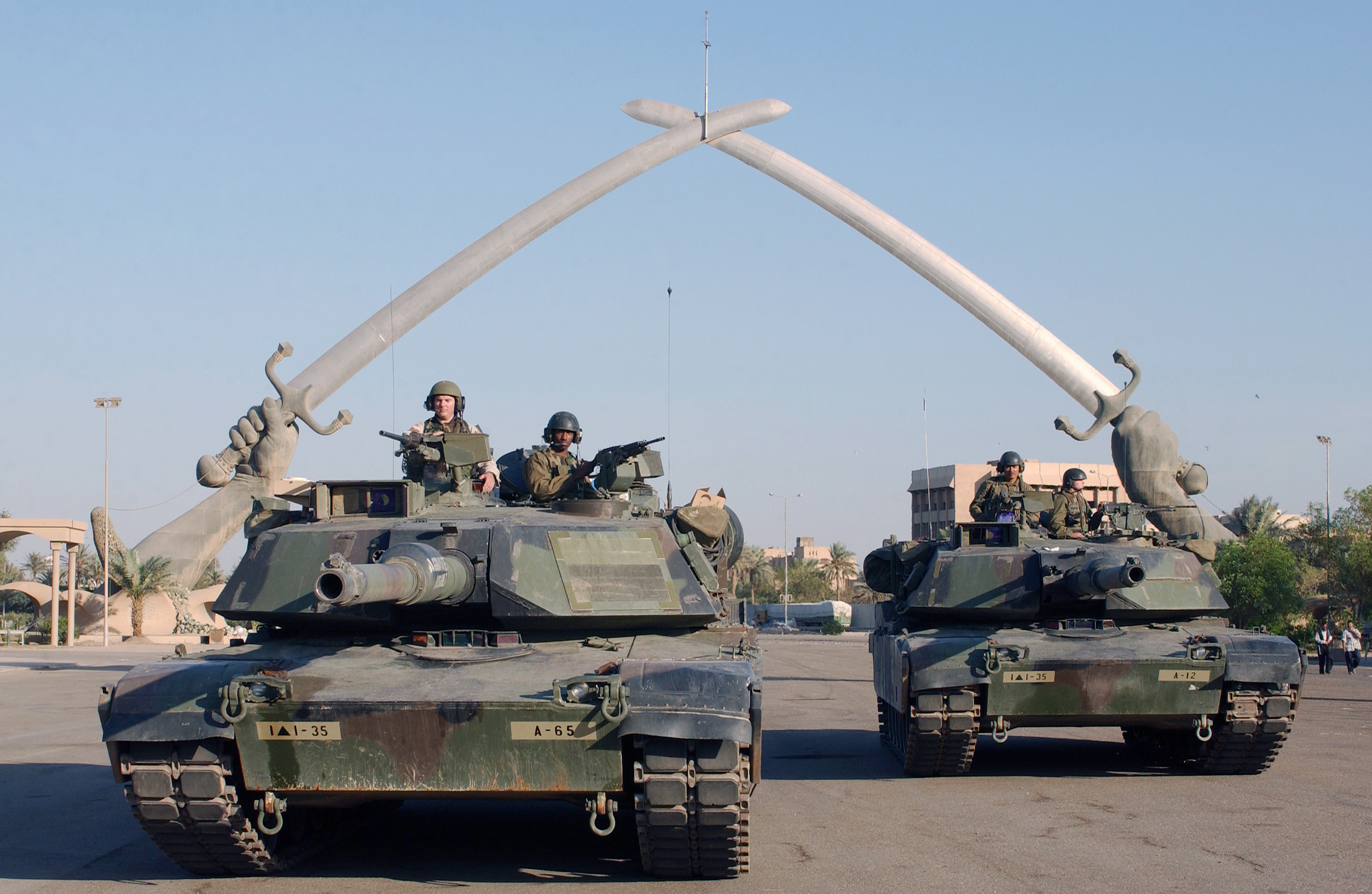
M1A1 Abrams pose for a photo under the "Hands of Victory" in Ceremony Square, Baghdad, Iraq.

A dispute exists over the legitimacy of the 2003 invasion of Iraq. The debate centers around the question whether the invasion was an unprovoked assault on an independent country that may have breached international law, or if the United Nations Security Council authorized the invasion (whether the conditions set in place after the Gulf War allowed the resumption if Iraq did not uphold to the Security Council resolutions). Those arguing for its legitimacy often point to Congressional Joint Resolution 114 and UN Security Council resolutions, such as Resolution 1441 and Resolution 678. Those arguing against its legitimacy also cite some of the same sources, stating they do not actually permit war but instead lay out conditions that must be met before war can be declared. Furthermore, the Security Council may only authorise the use of force against an "aggressor" in the interests of preserving peace, whereas the 2003 invasion of Iraq was not provoked by any aggressive military action.

There are ongoing debates regarding whether the invasion was launched with the explicit authorization of the United Nations Security Council. The Government of the United States asserts that the invasion was explicitly authorized by Security Council Resolution 678 and thus complies with international law. The Security Council Resolution 678 authorizes UN Member States to "use all necessary means to uphold and implement Resolution 660 and all subsequent relevant resolutions and to restore international peace and security in the area", however there exist different interpretations of its meaning. The only legal jurisdiction to find "aggression" or to find the invasion illegal rests with the Security Council under United Nations Charter Articles 39–42. The Security Council met in 2003 for two days, reviewed the legal claims involved, and elected to be "seized of the matter". The Security Council has not reviewed these issues since 2003. The public debate, however, continues. Former UN Secretary General Kofi Annan expressed his opinion that the invasion of Iraq was "not in conformity with the UN charter [...] from the charter point of view, [the invasion] was illegal".

=== Saddam's record ===
While in power, Saddam Hussein invaded Iran in 1980 and began the Iran–Iraq War, which lasted until 1988. Iraq's invasion was backed by the United States who funneled over $5 billion to support Saddam's party and sold Iraq hundreds of millions of dollars' worth of military equipment. During the war, Hussein used chemical weapons on at least 10 occasions, including attacks against civilians. In 1990, Iraq invaded Kuwait and began the Persian Gulf War. After the ceasefire agreement was signed between Saddam and the UN in 1991, which suspended the hostilities of the Gulf War, Iraq repeatedly violated 16 different UNSC resolutions from 1990 to 2002. The Iraq Survey Group interviewed regime officials who stated Hussein kept weapon scientists employed and planned to revive Iraq's WMD program after the inspections were lifted, including nuclear weapons. Under UN Resolution 1441, he was given a "final opportunity" to comply, and he again violated the resolution by submitting a false report to UNMOVIC inspectors and continually preventing them from inspecting Iraq's WMD sites.

During the Gulf War, Iraq took foreign civilians hostage on an unprecedented scale. Hussein attempted to use terrorism against the United States during the Gulf War and against former President George H.W. Bush in Kuwait in 1993 for leading the Gulf War against him. He had a long history of supporting fighters in Palestine by giving money to families of suicide bombers and gave refuge to other fighting groups against neighboring states in the region.

In 2000, two human rights groups, International Federation of Human Rights Leagues and the Coalition for Justice in Iraq, released a joint report documenting the indoctrination of children into a fighting force. These children as young as five were recruited into the Ashbal Saddam or Saddam's Cubs. The children would be separated from their parents and undergo military training. Parents objecting to this recruitment would be executed and children jailed if they failed to comply. These jails were later noted by Scott Ritter in an interview with Time magazine.

Vice President Cheney stated in 2006 that the U.S. would still have invaded Iraq even if intelligence had shown that there were no weapons of mass destruction. He said Hussein was still dangerous because of his history of using WMD, and taking him out of power "was the right thing to do".

According to Donald Rumsfeld, Saddam Hussein was giving $25,000 to the families of suicide bombers who were aggressive toward Israel.

=== Weapons of mass destruction ===
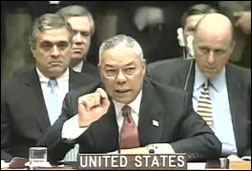
Colin Powell holding a model vial of anthrax while giving a presentation to the United Nations Security Council

In the past, Iraq had been supplied with chemical weapons and the technology to develop them by Germany, France, United States and the United Kingdom. Saddam used these weapons against Iranian forces in the Iran–Iraq War, and against Kurdish civilians in the Iraqi town of Halabja. In 1990 during the Gulf War Saddam had the opportunity to use these weapons, but chose not to. One of the noted reasons is the Iraqi forces' lack of up to date equipment to protect themselves from the effects, as well as the speed with which the US forces traversed the open desert. From 1991 to 1998 UNSCOM inspected Iraq and worked to locate and destroy WMD stockpiles. The team was replaced in 1999 with the United Nations Monitoring Verification and Inspection Commission, UNMOVIC.

In 2002, Scott Ritter, a former UNSCOM weapons inspector, heavily criticized the Bush administration and the news media for relying on the testimony of alleged Iraqi nuclear scientist and defector Khidir Hamza as a rationale for invading Iraq.

We seized the entire records of the Iraqi Nuclear program, especially the administrative records. We got a name of everybody, where they worked, what they did, and the top of the list, Saddam's "Bombmaker" [Which was the title of Hamza's book, and earned the nickname afterwards] was a man named Jafar Dhia Jafar, not Khidir Hamza, and if you go down the list of the senior administrative personnel you will not find Hamza's name in there. In fact, we didn't find his name at all, because in 1990 he didn't work for the Iraqi Nuclear Program. He had no knowledge of it because he worked as a kickback specialist for Hussein Kamel in the Presidential Palace.

He goes into northern Iraq and meets up with Ahmad Chalabi. He walks in and says, "I'm Saddam's 'Bombmaker'." So they call the CIA and they say, "we know who you are, you're not Saddam's 'Bombmaker', go sell your story to someone else." And he was released, he was rejected by all intelligence services at the time, he's a fraud.

And here we are, someone who the CIA knows is a fraud, the US Government knows is a fraud, is allowed to sit in front of the United States Senate Committee on Foreign Relations and give testimony as an expert witness. I got a problem with that, I got a problem with the American media, and I've told them over and over and over again that this man is a documentable fraud, a fake, and yet they allow him to go on CNN, MSNBC, CNBC, and testify as if he actually knows what he is talking about.

No militarily significant WMDs have been found in Iraq since the invasion, although several degraded chemical munitions dating to before 1991 have been. On 21 June 2006, a report was released through the United States Senate Select Committee on Intelligence, stating that since 2003, approximately 500 degraded chemical munitions have been discovered dating from before 1991 in Iraq, and "likely more will be recovered". The weapons are filled "most likely" with Sarin and Mustard Gas. However, the U.S. Department of Defense states that these weapons were not in usable condition, and that "these are not the WMDs this country and the rest of the world believed Iraq had, and not the WMDs for which this country went to war".

In January 2006, The New York Times reported that, "A high-level intelligence assessment by the Bush administration concluded in early 2002 that the sale of uranium from Niger to Iraq was 'unlikely'." The Iraqi government denied the existence of any such facilities or capabilities and called the reports lies and fabrications, which was backed by the post-war prima facie case that no WMDs were evident or found.

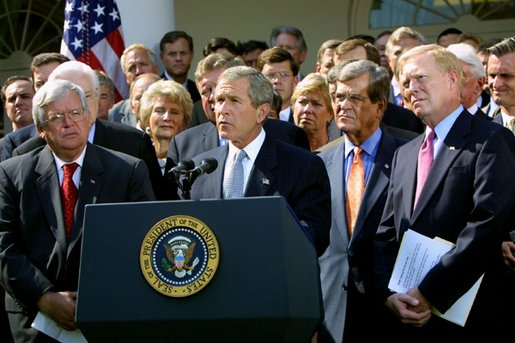
President George Bush, surrounded by leaders of the House and Senate, announces the Joint Resolution to Authorize the Use of United States Armed Forces Against Iraq, October 2, 2002.

Former CIA officials have stated that the White House knew before the invasion that Iraq had no weapons of mass destruction, but had decided to attack Iraq and continue to use the WMD story as a false pretext for launching the war. The leaked Downing Street Memo, an internal summary of a meeting between British defense and intelligence officials, states that Bush administration had decided to attack Iraq and to "fix intelligence" to support the WMD pretext to justify it. A transcript of a secret conversation between President Bush and PM Blair leaked by a government whistleblower reveals that the US and UK were prepared to invade Iraq even if no WMD were found. British officials in the memo also discuss a proposal by President Bush to provoke Iraq, including using fake UN planes, to manufacture a pretext for the invasion he had already decided on.

In 2004 the Butler Commission Report concluded that, "on the basis of the intelligence assessments at the time", statements by the British Government "on Iraqi attempts to buy uranium from Africa" were "well-founded". Opponents however consider the Butler Review a whitewash which lacked cross-party support (the panel was appointed by, and reported directly to, the Prime Minister).

The Iraq Intelligence Commission rejected claims that the Bush administration attempted to influence the intelligence community's pre-war assessments of Iraq's weapons programs, but it did not investigate whether the administration misled the public about the intelligence.

The Commission found no evidence of political pressure to influence the Intelligence Community's pre-war assessments of Iraq's weapons programs. As we discuss in detail in the body of our report, analysts universally asserted that in no instance did political pressure cause them to skew or alter any of their analytical judgments.

Paul R. Pillar, a 28-year veteran of the CIA, wrote in Foreign Affairs that the method of investigation used by [these] panels—essentially, asking analysts whether their arms had been twisted—would have caught only the crudest attempts at politicization:

The actual politicization of intelligence occurs subtly and can take many forms. … Well before March 2003, intelligence analysts and their managers knew that the United States was heading for war with Iraq. It was clear that the Bush administration would frown on or ignore analysis that called into question a decision to go to war and welcome analysis that supported such a decision. Intelligence analysts … felt a strong wind consistently blowing in one direction.

Pillar holds that intelligence was "misused to justify decisions already made".

Regime documents captured inside Iraq by coalition forces are reported to reveal Saddam's frustration with weapon inspections. Meeting transcripts record him saying to senior aides: "We don't have anything hidden!" He questions whether inspectors would "roam Iraq for 50 years". "When is this going to end?", he remarks. He tells his deputies in another: "Don't think for a minute that we still have WMD. We have nothing."

Former General Georges Sada maintains the Iraqi leadership ordered the removal of WMD from Iraq to Syria before the 2003 invasion, in spite of the findings by the Iraq Survey Group, citing an unnamed Iraqi airline captain said to be involved with the operations. On an episode of The Daily Show, Sada reiterated these claims. The final report on Iraqi weapons of mass destruction, issued by Charles Duelfer, concluded in April 2005 that the hunt for weapons of mass destruction had "gone as far as feasible" and found nothing. However, Duelfer reported though that the search for WMD material turned up nothing that his team was "unable to rule out unofficial movement of limited WMD-related materials".

=== Countries supporting and opposing the invasion ===
State positions on the Iraq War

Support for the invasion and occupation of Iraq included 49 nations, a group that was frequently referred to as the "coalition of the willing". These nations provided combat troops, support troops, and logistical support for the invasion. The nations contributing combat forces during the initial invasion were, roughly:

Total 297,384 – 99% US & UK

The United States contributed 250,000 forces (84%), the United Kingdom 45,000 (15%), Australia 2,000 (0.6%), Denmark 200 (0.06%), and Poland 184 (0.06%); these totals do not include the 50,000+ Iraqi Kurdish soldiers that assisted the coalition. Ten other countries offered small numbers of non-combat forces, mostly either medical teams and specialists in decontamination. In several of these countries a majority of the public was opposed to the war. For example, in Spain polls reported at one time a 90% opposition to the war. In most other countries less than 10% of the populace supported an invasion of Iraq without a specific go-ahead from the UN. According to a mid-January 2003 telephone poll, approximately one-third of the U.S. population supported a unilateral invasion by the US and its allies, while two-thirds supported war if directly authorized by the U.N.

Global protests expressed opposition to the invasion. In many Middle Eastern and Islamic countries there were mass protests, as well as in Europe. On the government level, the war was criticized by Canada, Belgium, Chile, Russia, France, the People's Republic of China, Germany, Switzerland, the Vatican, India, Iraq, Indonesia, Malaysia, New Zealand, Brazil, Mexico, the Arab League, the African Union and many others. Although many nations opposed the war, no foreign government openly supported Saddam Hussein, and none volunteered any assistance to the Iraqi side. Leading traditional allies of the U.S. who had supported Security Council Resolution 1441, France, Germany and Russia, emerged as a united front opposed to the U.S.-led invasion, urging that the UN weapons inspectors be given time to complete their work.

Saudi Foreign Minister Prince Saud said the U.S. military could not use Saudi Arabia's soil in any way to attack Iraq. After ten years of U.S. presence in Saudi Arabia, cited among reasons by Saudi-born Osama bin Laden for his al-Qaeda attacks on America on 11 September 2001, most of U.S. forces were withdrawn in 2003.

=== Opposition view of the invasion ===
Those who opposed the war in Iraq did not regard Iraq's violation of UN resolutions to be a valid case for the war, since no single nation has the authority, under the UN Charter, to judge Iraq's compliance to UN resolutions and to enforce them. Furthermore, critics argued that the US was applying double standards of justice, noting that other nations such as Israel are also in breach of UN resolutions and have nuclear weapons.

Giorgio Agamben, the Italian philosopher, has offered a critique of the logic of preemptive war.

Although Iraq was known to have pursued an active nuclear weapons development program previously, as well as to have tried to procure materials and equipment for their manufacture, these weapons and material have yet to be discovered. President Bush's reference to Iraqi attempts to purchase uranium in Africa in his 2003 State of the Union address are by now commonly considered as having been based on forged documents (see Yellowcake forgery).

Robert Fisk, Middle East correspondent for The Independent, comments in his book The Great War for Civilisation that history is repeating itself. Fisk, in the Dutch TV news program Nova: "It is not just similar, it is 'fingerprint' the same." In 1917, the UK invaded Iraq, claiming to come "not as conquerors but as liberators". After an insurrection in 1920, "the first town that was bombed was Fallujah and the next town that was laid siege to was Najaf". Then, the British army intelligence services claimed that terrorists were crossing the border from Syria. Prime minister Lloyd George stood up in the house of commons and declared that "if British troops leave Iraq there will be civil war". The British were going to set up a democracy in Iraq. In a referendum, however, a king was 'elected'. "They decided they would no longer use troops on the ground, it was too dangerous, they would use the Royal Air force to bomb villages from the air. And eventually, [...] we left and our leaders were overthrown and the Ba'ath party, which was a revolutionary socialist party at the time—Saddam Hussein—took over. And I'm afraid that the Iraq we are creating now is an Iraq of anarchy and chaos. And as long as we stay there, the chaos will get worse."

=== Christian ethics positions ===
Pope John Paul II spoke out against the war several times, and said that a war with Iraq would be a "disaster" and a "crime against peace". During the build-up to the war, a hundred Christian scholars of ethical theory issued a statement condemning the war as morally unjustifiable. Their brief statement, which was published in the 23 September edition of the [Chronicle of Higher Education], read as follows: "As Christian Ethicists, we share a common moral presumption against a preemptive war on Iraq by the United States." The group included scholars from a wide array of universities, including traditionally left-leaning Ivy League schools as well as more conservative institutions such as Lipscomb University, in Nashville, Lubbock Christian University, in Lubbock, Texas (both affiliated with the Churches of Christ), and the Baptist Theological Seminary at Richmond. Other scholars of the just war theory asserted that war with Iraq could be justified on the grounds of defense of a "helpless other". This position is based on the position that war could be justified on the grounds of liberating a helpless people being victimized by a tyrannical ruler.

== International law ==
=== International Court of Justice ===
The International Court of Justice is the principal judicial organ of the United Nations. The General Assembly or the Security Council may request that the International Court of Justice provide an advisory opinion on any legal question. Any organ or agency of the UN so authorized by the General Assembly may also request the ICJ for an advisory opinion.

== Principal legal rationales ==
The United Nations Charter is the foundation of modern international law. The US and its principal coalition allies in the 2003 invasion of Iraq have all ratified the charter and are thus legally bound by its terms. Article 2(4) of the UN Charter generally bans the use of force by states except when carefully circumscribed conditions are met, stating:

All members shall refrain in their international relations from the threat or use of force against the territorial integrity or political independence of any state, or in any other manner inconsistent with the purposes of the United Nations.

According to Louise Doswald-Beck, Secretary-General International Commission of Jurists, this rule was "enshrined in the United Nations Charter in 1945 for a good reason: to prevent states from using force as they felt so inclined". Therefore, in the absence of an armed attack against the US or the coalition members, any legal use or threat of force against Iraq had to be supported by a UN Security Council resolution.

However, under Article 51 of the UN Charter, the US and its coalition allies reserved the right to self-defense even without a UN mandate. The US cited the 1993 assassination attempt on former US President George H. W. Bush and the firing on coalition aircraft enforcing the 1991 Gulf War ceasefire no-fly zones over Northern and Southern Iraq. The US also cited Iraq's major offensive against the city of Irbil in Iraqi Kurdistan in violation of UNSC Resolution 688, prohibiting repression of Iraq's ethnic minorities. In retaliation, the US conducted the bombing of Iraq in June 1993 and again in 1996.

The US and UK governments, along with others, also stated that the invasion was entirely legal because it was already authorized by existing United Nations Security Council resolutions. They characterized the invasion as a resumption of previously temporarily suspended hostilities rather than a war of aggression, as the US and UK were acting as agents for Kuwait's defense in response to Iraq's 1990 invasion. Some international legal experts, including the International Commission of Jurists, the U.S.-based National Lawyers' Guild, a group of 31 Canadian law professors, and the U.S.-based Lawyers' Committee on Nuclear Policy, have found this legal rationale to be untenable and are of the view that the invasion was not supported by UN resolution and was therefore illegal.

=== UN resolutions ===
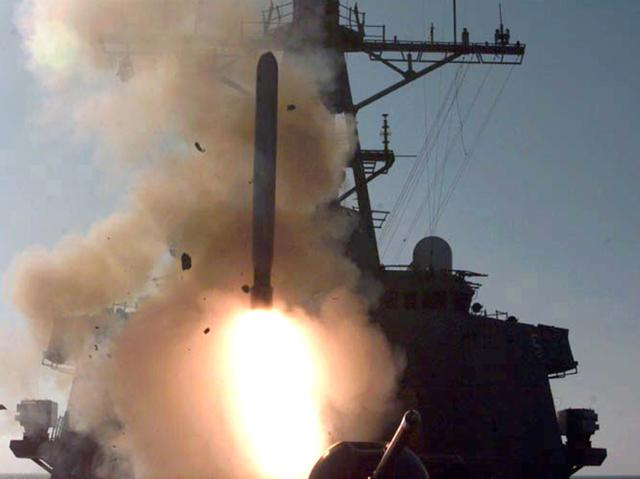
A Tomahawk cruise missile (TLAM) is fired from an Arleigh Burke-class destroyer during the fourth wave of attacks on Iraq in support of Operation Desert Fox.

As part of the 1991 Gulf War ceasefire agreement, the Iraqi government agreed to Security Council Resolution 687, which called for weapons inspectors to search locations in Iraq for chemical, biological and nuclear weapons, as well as weapons that exceed an effective distance of 150 kilometres. After the passing of resolution 687, thirteen additional resolutions (699, 707, 715, 949, 1051, 1060, 1115, 1134, 1137, 1154, 1194, 1205, 1284) were passed by the Security Council reaffirming the continuation of inspections, or citing Iraq's failure to comply fully with them. On 9 September 1998, the Security Council passed resolution 1194 which unanimously condemns Iraq's suspension of cooperation with UNSCOM, one month later on 31 October Iraq officially declares it will cease all forms of interaction with UNSCOM.

The period between 31 October 1998, and the initiation of Operation Desert Fox (16 December 1998), contained talks by the Iraqi government with the United Nations Security Council. During these talks Iraq attempted to attach conditions to the work of UNSCOM and the International Atomic Energy Agency, which was against previous resolutions calling for unconditional access. The situation was defused after Iraq's Ambassador to the U.N., Nizar Hamdoon, submitted a third letter stating the position of the Iraqi government on 31 October was "void". After weapons inspections resumed, UNSCOM requested arms documents related to weapon usage and destruction during the Iran–Iraq War. The Iraqi government rejected this request because it was handwritten and did not fall within the scope of the UN mandate. The UN inspectors insisted in order to know if Iraq destroyed all of its weapons, it had to know "the total holdings of Iraq's chemical weapons". Further incidents erupted as Iraqi officials demanded "lists of things and materials" being searched for during surprise inspections.

On 16 December 1998, U.S. President Bill Clinton initiated Operation Desert Fox based on Iraq's failure to fully comply with the inspectors. Clinton noted the announcement made by the Iraqi government on 31 October, stating they would no longer cooperate with UNSCOM. Also noted was the numerous efforts to hinder UNSCOM officials, including prevention of photographing evidence and photocopying documents, as well as prevention of interviewing Iraqi personnel.

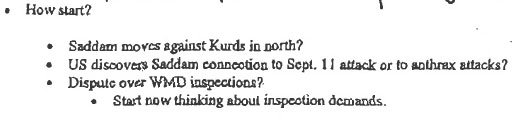
Excerpt from Donald Rumsfeld memo dated 27 Nov. 2001

Inspection teams were withdrawn before the Operation Desert Fox bombing campaign and did not return for four years. The United Nations no-fly zone enforced by the United States, United Kingdom and France—also legality disputed—became a location of constant exchange of fire since Iraqi Vice President Taha Yassin Ramadan instructed Iraqi military to attack all planes in the no-fly zone.

A memo written by US Secretary of Defense Rumsfeld dated 27 Nov 2001 considers a US invasion of Iraq. One section of the memo questions "How start?", listing multiple possible justifications for a US-Iraq War, one scenario being "Dispute over WMD inspections—Start thinking now about inspection demands". In late 2002, after international pressure and more UN Resolutions, Iraq allowed inspection teams back into the country. In 2003, UNMOVIC was inspecting Iraq but were ordered out. There is no credible evidence of WMD production (see Duelfer Report) and no WMDs have been found to date after 1991 (see below and WMD in Iraq). George W. Bush has since admitted that "much of the intelligence turned out to be wrong".

The United States offered intelligence from the Central Intelligence Agency and British MI5 to the United Nations Security Council suggesting that Iraq possessed weapons of mass destruction. The U.S. claimed that justification rested upon Iraq's violation of several U.N. Resolutions, most recently UN Security Council Resolution 1441. U.S. president George W. Bush claimed Iraq's WMDs posed a significant threat to the United States and its allies. An inspection team UNMOVIC, before completing its UN-mandate or completing its report was ordered out by the UN because the US-led invasion appeared imminent.

The then United Nations Secretary-General Kofi Annan said in September 2004 that, "From our point of view and the UN Charter point of view, it [the war] was illegal."

The political leaders of the US and UK at the time argued that the war was legal, and that existing UN Security Council resolutions related to the first Persian Gulf War and the subsequent ceasefire (660, 678), and to later inspections of Iraqi weapons programs (1441), had already authorized the invasion. Critics of the invasion have challenged both of these assertions, arguing that an additional Security Council resolution would have been necessary to specifically authorize the invasion.

==== Resolution 1441 ====
UNSC Resolution 1441 was passed unanimously on 8 November 2002, to give Iraq "a final opportunity to comply with its disarmament obligations" that had been set out in several previous resolutions (resolution 660, resolution 661, resolution 678, resolution 686, resolution 687, resolution 688, resolution 707, resolution 715, resolution 986, and resolution 1284). According to the US State Department, "The resolution strengthened the mandate of the UN Monitoring and Verification Commission (UNMOVIC) and the International Atomic Energy Agency (IAEA), giving them authority to go anywhere, at any time and talk to anyone in order to verify Iraq's disarmament."

The most important text of Resolution 1441 was to require that Iraq "shall provide UNMOVIC and the IAEA immediate, unimpeded, unconditional, and unrestricted access to any and all, including underground, areas, facilities, buildings, equipment, records, and means of transport which they wish to inspect". However, on 27 January 2003, Hans Blix, the lead member of the UNMOVIC, said that, "Iraq appears not to have come to a genuine acceptance, not even today, of the disarmament that was demanded of it." Blix noted that Iraq had failed to cooperate in a number of areas, including (1) the failure to provide safety to U-2 spy planes that inspectors hoped to use for aerial surveillance, (2) refusal to let UN inspectors into several chemical, biological, and missile sites on the belief that they were engaging in espionage rather than disarmament, (3) submitting a 12,000-page arms declaration in December 2002, which contained little more than old material previously submitted to inspectors, and (4) failure to produce convincing evidence to the UN inspectors that it had unilaterally destroyed its anthrax stockpiles as required by resolution 687 a decade before 1441 was passed in 2002. On 7 March 2003, Blix said that Iraq had made significant progress toward resolving open issues of disarmament but the cooperation was still not "immediate" and "unconditional" as called for by UN Security Council Resolution 1441. He concluded that it would take "but months" to resolve the key remaining disarmament tasks. The US government observed this as a breach of resolution 1441 because Iraq did not meet the requirement of "immediate" and "unconditional" compliance.

On the day Resolution 1441 was passed, the US ambassador to the UN, John Negroponte, assured the Security Council that there were no "hidden triggers" with respect to the use of force and that, in the event of a "further breach" by Iraq, resolution 1441 would require that "the matter will return to the Council for discussions as required in paragraph 12". However, he then added, "If the Security Council fails to act decisively in the event of further Iraqi violations, this resolution does not constrain any Member State from acting to defend itself against the threat posed by Iraq or to enforce relevant United Nations resolutions and protect world peace and security."

At the same meeting, UK Permanent Representative Sir Jeremy Greenstock KCMG used many of the same words and stated, "If there is a further Iraqi breach of its disarmament obligations, the matter will return to the Council for discussion as required in Operational Paragraph 12."

On 17 March 2003, the Attorney General for England and Wales, Lord Goldsmith, agreed that the use of force against Iraq was justified by resolution 1441 in combination with the earlier resolutions 678 and 687.

According to an independent commission of inquiry set up by the government of the Netherlands, UN resolution 1441 "cannot reasonably be interpreted as authorizing individual member states to use military force to compel Iraq to comply with the Security Council's resolutions".

==== Resolutions related to First Persian Gulf War and also the 2003 invasion ====
As part of the 1991 Gulf War ceasefire agreement, the Iraqi government agreed to UN Security Council Resolution 687, which called for weapons inspectors to search locations in Iraq for chemical, biological, and nuclear weapons, as well as for weapons that exceeded an effective distance of 150 kilometers. After the passing of resolution 687, thirteen additional resolutions (699, 707, 715, 949, 1051, 1060, 1115, 1134, 1137, 1154, 1194, 1205, 1284) were passed by the Security Council, reaffirming the continuation of inspections or citing Iraq's failure to comply fully with them. On 9 September 1998, the Security Council passed Resolution 1194, which unanimously condemned Iraq's suspension of cooperation with UNSCOM. One month later, on 31 October, Iraq officially declared that it would cease all forms of interaction with UNSCOM.

Resolution 678 (1990) allows the use of any means necessary to enforce resolution 660 (1990) and subsequent relevant resolutions in order to force Iraq to stop certain activities that threaten international peace and security, such as making weapons of mass destruction and refusing or obstructing United Nations weapons inspections in violation of United Nations Security Council Resolution 68.

The commission of inquiry by the government of the Netherlands found that the UN resolution of the 1990s provided no authority for the invasion.

=== Criticisms ===
The legal right to determine how to enforce its own resolutions lies with the Security Council alone (UN Charter Articles 39–42) and not with individual nations. On 8 November 2002, immediately after the adoption of Security Council resolution 1441, Russia, the People's Republic of China, and France issued a joint statement declaring that Council Resolution 1441 did not authorize any "automaticity" in the use of force against Iraq and that a further Council resolution was needed if force were to be used. Critics pointed out that statements from US officials leading up to the war indicated their belief that a new Security Council resolution was required to make an invasion legal. They also pointed out that the UN Security Council had not made such a determination despite serious debate over this issue. To secure Syria's vote in favor of Council Resolution 1441, Secretary of State Powell reportedly advised Syrian officials that "there is nothing in the resolution to allow it to be used as a pretext to launch a war on Iraq".

The UN Security Council, as outlined in Article 39 of the UN Charter, theoretically has the ability to rule on the legality of the war, but the US and the UK have veto power in the Security Council, so action is highly improbable even if the issue were to be raised. Despite this, the UN General Assembly (UNGA) may ask that the International Court of Justice (ICJ)—"the principal judicial organ of the United Nations" (Article 92)—give either an 'advisory opinion' or 'judgement' on the legality of the war. Indeed, the UNGA asked the ICJ to give an 'advisory opinion' on "the legal consequences arising from the construction of the wall being built by Israel", by its resolution A/RES/ES-10/14, as recently as 12 December 2003; despite opposition from permanent members of the Security Council. It achieved this by sitting in tenth 'emergency special session', under the framework of the 'Uniting for Peace' resolution. The ICJ had previously found against the US for its actions in Nicaragua, a finding the US refused to comply with.

The United States structured its reports to the United Nations Security Council around intelligence from the Central Intelligence Agency and Secret Intelligence Service (MI6) stating that Iraq possessed weapons of mass destruction. The US claimed that justification for the war rested upon Iraq's violation of several UN resolutions, with the most recent being UN Security Council Resolution 1441.

==== Commission of Inquiry of the Dutch Government ====
According to a detailed legal investigation conducted by an independent commission of inquiry set up by the government of the Netherlands, the 2003 invasion violated international law. The investigation was headed by former Netherlands Supreme Court president Willibrord Davids and concluded that the notion of "regime change", as practiced by the powers that invaded Iraq, had "no basis in international law". Also, the commission found that UN resolution 1441 "cannot reasonably be interpreted as authorizing individual member states to use military force to compel Iraq to comply with the Security Council's resolutions". In a letter to the parliament, the Dutch cabinet admitted that MPs could have been better informed about the doubts and uncertainties of the Dutch intelligence services and about the United States' request for Dutch support.

The Davids inquiry also investigated rumors but was unable to find any proof that the appointment of former Dutch foreign minister De Hoop Scheffer as NATO secretary general was the result of his support for the US-led invasion of Iraq. In February 2010, De Hoop Scheffer himself criticized the Davids Commission report. In an interview with newspaper de Volkskrant, he argued that the cabinet did fully inform parliament and that there had never been any doubts. He rejected the conclusion that it took less than 45 minutes to decide to give political support to the United States. He also contested the conclusion that Prime Minister Balkenende failed to provide adequate leadership. In addition, he argued that no United Nations mandate was needed for the invasion of Iraq and remarked that there was no UN mandate when the Netherlands supported the 1991 US operations in Iraq.

==== Doubts in the British government ====
Jack Straw, then UK Foreign Secretary, sent a secret letter to Prime Minister Tony Blair in April 2002, warning Blair that the case for military action against Iraq was of "dubious legality". The letter goes on to state that "regime change per se is no justification for military action" and that "the weight of legal advice here is that a fresh [UN] mandate may well be required". Such a new UN mandate was never given. The letter also expresses doubts regarding the outcome of military action.

In March 2003, Elizabeth Wilmshurst, then deputy legal adviser to the British Foreign Office, resigned in protest of Britain's decision to invade without Security Council authorization. Wilmshurst also insinuated that the English Attorney General Lord Goldsmith also believed the war was illegal but that he changed his opinion several weeks before the invasion.

In March 2004, when a Royal Court trial raised the question of whether the invasion was legal, the under-secretary of state, Sir Michael Hastings, wrote to the court and warned, "it would be prejudicial to the national interest and to the conduct of the Government's foreign policy if the English courts were to express opinions on questions of international law."

In 2010, then-deputy prime minister of a later government Nick Clegg, during prime minister's questions in Parliament, asserted that the Iraq war was illegal. Statements issued later suggested that this was a personal view and not a formal view of the coalition government.

In 2016, the deputy prime minister at the time of the invasion, John Prescott, wrote: "In 2004, the UN Secretary-General Kofi Annan said that as regime change was the prime aim of the Iraq War, it was illegal. With great sadness and anger, I now believe him to be right."

In 2017, the UK Chancellor of the Exchequer at the time of the invasion, Gordon Brown, in his memoir "My Life - Our Times" said that US president George W Bush duped Tony Blair into the 2003 Iraq War. Brown sensationally revealed that the US kept quiet about a top-secret report which showed there was no evidence Iraq had weapons of mass destruction. Brown added, "It is astonishing that none of us in the British government ever saw this American report."

The Iraq Inquiry in the UK later found that the legal basis for the law was questionable.

=== War of aggression ===
The International Military Tribunal at Nuremberg held following World War II determined that waging a war of aggression is a war crime:

"[It is] essentially an evil thing [to] initiate a war of aggression. [It] is not only an international crime; it is the supreme international crime, differing only from other war crimes in that it contains within itself the accumulated evil of the whole."

Benjamin B. Ferencz was a former law professor and one of the chief prosecutors for the United States at the military trials of German officials following World War II. In an interview given on 25 August 2006, Ferencz stated that in addition to Saddam Hussein, George W. Bush should be tried as well because the Iraq War was started by the U.S. without permission by the UN Security Council. Benjamin B. Ferencz wrote the foreword for Michael Haas's book, George W. Bush, War Criminal?: The Bush Administration's Liability for 269 War Crimes. Ferencz elaborated as follows:

a prima facie case can be made that the United States is guilty of the supreme crime against humanity, that being an illegal war of aggression against a sovereign nation.

...

The United Nations charter has a provision which was agreed to by the United States, formulated by the United States, in fact, after World War II. It says that from now on, no nation can use armed force without the permission of the U.N. Security Council. They can use force in connection with self-defense, but a country can't use force in anticipation of self-defense. Regarding Iraq, the last Security Council resolution essentially said, "Look, send the weapons inspectors out to Iraq, have them come back and tell us what they've found – then we'll figure out what we're going to do." The U.S. was impatient, and decided to invade Iraq – which was all pre-arranged of course. So, the United States went to war, in violation of the charter.

Professor Ferencz quoted the resignation letter of British deputy legal adviser to the Foreign Ministry, Elizabeth Wilmshurst, who resigned suddenly before the Iraq war started:

I regret that I cannot agree that it is lawful to use force against Iraq without a second Security Council resolution. [A]n unlawful use of force on such a scale amounts to the crime of aggression; nor can I agree with such action in circumstances that are so detrimental to the international order and the rule of law.

According to the International Commission of Jurists (ICJ) in Geneva, the invasion of Iraq was neither in self-defense against armed attack nor sanctioned by a UN Security Council resolution authorizing the use of force and thus constituted the crime of war of aggression. A "war waged without a clear mandate from the United Nations Security Council would constitute a flagrant violation of the prohibition of the use of force". We note with "deep dismay that a small number of states are poised to launch an outright illegal invasion of Iraq, which amounts to a war of aggression".

Then Iraq Ambassador to the United Nations Mohammed Aldouri shared the view that the invasion was a violation of international law and constituted a war of aggression, as did a number of American legal experts, including Marjorie Cohn, Professor at Thomas Jefferson School of Law and president of the National Lawyers Guild, and former Attorney-General of the United States Ramsey Clark.

== Domestic law ==
=== United States ===
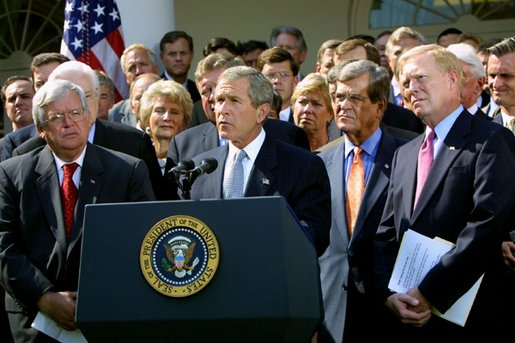
President George Bush, surrounded by leaders of the House and Senate, announces the Joint Resolution to Authorize the Use of United States Armed Forces Against Iraq, October 2, 2002.

With the support of large bipartisan majorities, the U.S. Congress passed the Authorization for Use of Military Force Against Iraq Resolution of 2002. The resolution asserts the authorization by the Constitution of the United States and the United States Congress for the President to fight anti-United States terrorism. Citing the Iraq Liberation Act of 1998, the resolution reiterated that it should be the policy of the United States to remove the Saddam Hussein regime and promote a democratic replacement. The resolution "supported" and "encouraged" diplomatic efforts by President George W. Bush to "strictly enforce through the U.N. Security Council all relevant Security Council resolutions regarding Iraq" and "obtain prompt and decisive action by the Security Council to ensure that Iraq abandons its strategy of delay, evasion, and noncompliance and promptly and strictly complies with all relevant Security Council resolutions regarding Iraq". The resolution authorized President Bush to use the Armed Forces of the United States "as he determines to be necessary and appropriate" in order to "defend the national security of the United States against the continuing threat posed by Iraq; and enforce all relevant UN Security Council Resolutions regarding Iraq".

=== United Kingdom ===
==== Opinion of the Attorney General for England and Wales ====
Before the invasion, the then Attorney General for England and Wales, Lord Goldsmith, advised that the war would be in breach of international law for six reasons, ranging from the lack of a second United Nations resolution to UN inspector Hans Blix's continuing search for weapons. Ten days later, on 7 March 2003, as UK troops were massing in Kuwait, Lord Goldsmith changed his mind, saying:

I remain of the opinion that the safest legal course would be to secure the adoption of a further resolution to authorise the use of force.... Nevertheless, having regard to the information on the negotiating history which I have been given and to the arguments of the US Administration which I heard in Washington, I accept that a reasonable case can be made that resolution 1441 is capable in principle of reviving the authorisation in 678 without a further resolution.

He concluded his revised analysis by saying that "regime change cannot be the objective of military action".

==== Downing Street memo ====
On 1 May 2005, a related UK document known as the Downing Street memo was apparently leaked to The Sunday Times. The memo, which details the minutes of a 26 July 2002 meeting, recorded the head of the Secret Intelligence Service (MI6), after his recent visit to Washington, expressing his view that, "Bush wanted to remove Saddam, through military action, justified by the conjunction of terrorism and WMD. But the intelligence and facts were being fixed around the policy." It also quoted Foreign Secretary Jack Straw as saying that it was clear that Bush had "made up his mind" to take military action but that "the case was thin" and Attorney-General Goldsmith as warning that justifying the invasion on legal grounds would be difficult.

British officials did not dispute the document's authenticity but did dispute that it accurately stated the situation.

==== Cabinet meeting minutes ====
The minutes of the cabinet meetings where the legality of the Iraq war was discussed were subjected to a Freedom of Information request in 2007. The request was refused. On 19 February 2008, the Information Commissioner ordered the minutes to be disclosed in the public interest, but the government appealed to the Information Tribunal. When the Tribunal upheld the order for disclosure in early 2009, Jack Straw (then Justice Minister) issued the first ever ministerial veto (Section 53 of the Freedom of Information Act 2000) and prevented the release of the minutes. On 6 July 2016, extracts from the minutes were disclosed by the Iraq Inquiry.

=== Germany ===
On 21 June 2005, in a minor criminal case, the German Federal Administrative Court decided not to convict a Major in the German Army of the crime of refusing duty that would advance the Iraq war. With regard to the Iraq War, the court found that it had "grave concerns in terms of public international law". However, the court also did not clearly state that the war and the contributions to it by the German Federal Government were outright illegal.

Nikolaus Schultz wrote of this decision: "The Court did not express an opinion as to whether the war on Iraq constituted an act of aggression in the first part of its judgement when dealing with the exceptions to the obligation of a German member of the Federal Armed Forces to obey orders. At a later stage in the written reasons, however, it jumped to the conclusion that a state that resorts to military force without justification and, therefore, violates the prohibition of the use of force provided for by Art. 2.4 of the Charter, at the same time commits an act of military aggression. The (non-binding) Definition of Aggression of the GA attached to UN General Assembly Resolution 3314 is broad enough to support this conclusion. However, it has to be recalled that the State Parties to the Rome Statute of the International Criminal Court (ICC) could not agree on a definition of the crime of aggression."

He summarized: "These findings were watered down to an extent by the Court when it used the cautious proviso that the actions of the states involved only gave rise to grave concerns before arguing the respective issues at stake. By doing that, the Court shifted the burden to the individual soldiers and their decision of conscience whether to obey an order rather than reaching the conclusion that participating in a war violating rules of international law, and even constituting an act of aggression, as the court held, would be illegal and, therefore, justify insubordination."

=== Netherlands ===
Following intelligence from the UK and US, the Dutch government supported the operation of the multinational force in 2003. In January 2010, the 10-month Davids Commission inquiry published its final report. The Commission had been tasked with investigating Dutch government decision-making on political support for the war in Iraq in 2003 . The inquiry by the Dutch commission was the first ever independent legal assessment of the invasion decision. The Dutch commissioners included the former president of the Supreme Court, a former judge of the European Court of Justice, and two academic lawyers.

According to the report, the Dutch cabinet failed to fully inform the House of Representatives that the allies' military action against Iraq "had no sound mandate under international law" and that the United Kingdom was instrumental in influencing the Dutch decision to back the war. It also emerged that the British government had refused to disclose a key document requested by the Dutch panel, a letter to Balkenende from Tony Blair, asking for the support. This letter was said to have been handed over in a "breach of diplomatic protocol" and therefore for Balkenende's eyes only.

In response, Balkenende stated that he had fully informed the House of Representatives about government support for the invasion and that Saddam Hussein's repeated refusal to respect UN resolutions and cooperate with UN weapons inspectors had justified the invasion.

=== Australia ===
What domestic legal process that Australia followed to enter the Iraq war (and other wars entered post World War II) is unclear and whether its exercise was valid has been questioned. For practical purposes, the decision to commit the Australian Defence Force (ADF) to armed conflict is a decision of the elected government, made by the prime minister following deliberations of the National Security Committee of Cabinet (NSC). How this decision became legally effective is unclear however.

It is commonly accepted that the war-making power is a prerogative power falling under section 61 of the Constitution. Section 61 makes the executive power of the Commonwealth exercisable by the governor-general, who by convention only acts on the advice of ministers. However Peter Hollingworth, the governor-general in office at the time, does not recall formally approving the decision to commit Australian forces. It also arguable however, that the minister for Defence can commit the ADF to war independently using section 8 of the Defence Act and as such it is likely this was the legal method used to commit troops. While the governor-general did indicate that he would be willing to sign off any orders in accordance with advice, he was rebuffed after asking the attorney-general for clarification regarding "technical ramifications that could arise under international law".

In an inquiry into the war-making powers, the Attorney-General's Department stated that Defence was not aware of any "practice or requirement" for the minister to use section 8 to deploy Australian forces. Additionally, Defence relayed its legal advice that the war-making power "is an exercise of prerogative power pursuant to section 61 of the Constitution" and that "there is no constitutional requirement for the Government to act through the Governor-General in such circumstances". This position has been confirmed in a memorandum of the Australian Government released in 2024, stating that the decision to deploy the ADF "is a prerogative of the Executive Government". Professor Charles Sampford has challenged the legality of this position. He argues that constitutional powers under section 61 cannot be exercised independently by the prime minister without involving the governor-general.

== See also ==
- At the Center of the Storm: My Years at the CIA
- Command responsibility
- Criticism of the Iraq War
- Democide
- Human rights in post-invasion Iraq
- Human Rights Record of the United States
- Hussein Kamel al-Majid
- International Criminal Court and the 2003 invasion of Iraq
- Invasion of Iraq
- Iraq War misappropriations
- Jus ad bellum
- Kuala Lumpur War Crimes Commission
- Laws of war
- Legality of the Russian invasion of Ukraine
- List of Iraq War resisters
- List of United Nations Security Council resolutions concerning Iraq
- Movement to impeach George W. Bush
- Opposition to the Iraq War
- Protests against the Iraq War
- Public relations preparations for 2003 invasion of Iraq
- Rationale for the Iraq War
- The Prosecution of George W. Bush for Murder
- United Nations Security Council and the Iraq War
- United States and the International Criminal Court
- Views on the 2003 invasion of Iraq
- War crimes committed by the United States
- War crimes
- War of aggression
- War on terrorism
