= United Nations Security Council Resolution 1137 =

UN Security Council Resolution 1137
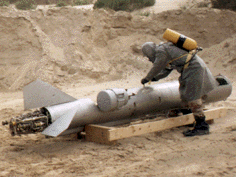
- Iraqi missile being disassembled
- Date: 12 November 1997
- Meeting no.: 3,826
- Code: S/RES/1137 (Document)
- Subject: The situation between Iraq and Kuwait
- Voting summary: 15 voted for; None voted against; None abstained
- Result: Adopted

Security Council composition
- Permanent members: China; France; Russia; United Kingdom; United States
- Non-permanent members: Chile; Costa Rica; Egypt; Guinea-Bissau; Japan; Kenya; South Korea; Poland; Portugal; Sweden

United Nations Security Council resolution 1137, adopted unanimously on 12 November 1997, after reaffirming resolutions 687 (1991), 707 (1991), 715 (1991), 1060 (1996), 1115 (1997) and 1134 (1997) on the monitoring of Iraq's weapons programme, the Council imposed travel restrictions on Iraqi officials and members of the armed forces after non-compliance with the United Nations Special Commission (UNSCOM).

The Security Council was concerned at letters it received from Iraqi officials imposing conditions on its co-operation with UNSCOM and implicitly threatening the safety of reconnaissance aircraft, demanding that they be withdrawn from Iraqi airspace. Iraq had also moved dual use equipment which was being monitored by the commission, which the council deemed unacceptable. UNSCOM itself had reported that two of its officers were denied access to Iraq based on their citizenship, weapons inspectors were denied access to certain sites and observation cameras had been tampered with or covered over. Diplomatic consultations had been undertaken and Iraq had been warned of further measures if it did not comply.

The resolution, acting under Chapter VII of the United Nations Charter, condemned Iraq's continued violations of its obligations under the resolutions and demanded that the country fully and unconditionally co-operate with the Special Commission. In accordance with Resolution 1134, all countries were now required to impose a travel ban on Iraqi officials and members of the armed forces who were responsible for the instances of non-compliance. A list of individuals to which the ban would apply was also created. The restrictions would only end the day after the Special Commission reported that Iraq allowed the inspection teams immediate, unconditional and unrestricted access to any given site, equipment, information, transport or people.

== See also ==
- Foreign relations of Iraq
- Gulf War
- Invasion of Kuwait
- Iraq and weapons of mass destruction
- Iraq disarmament timeline 1990–2003
- Iraq sanctions
- List of United Nations Security Council Resolutions 1101 to 1200 (1997–1998)
