= United Nations Security Council Resolution 1194 =

UN Security Council Resolution 1194
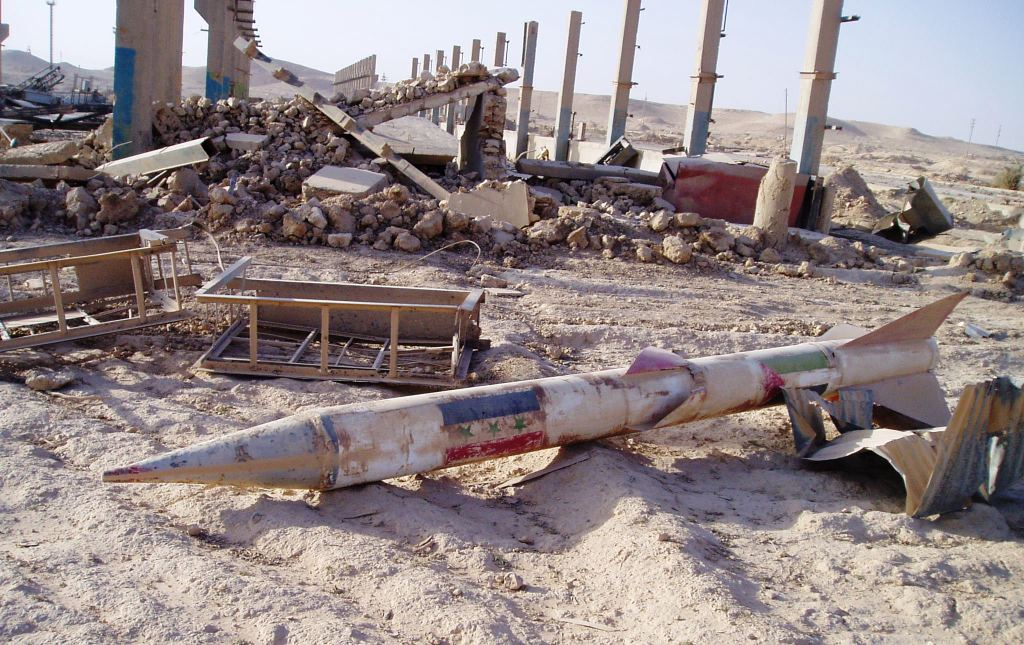
- Iraqi missile
- Date: 9 September 1998
- Meeting no.: 3,924
- Code: S/RES/1194 (Document)
- Subject: The situation between Iraq and Kuwait
- Voting summary: 15 voted for; None voted against; None abstained
- Result: Adopted

Security Council composition
- Permanent members: China; France; Russia; United Kingdom; United States
- Non-permanent members: Bahrain; Brazil; Costa Rica; Gabon; Gambia; Japan; Kenya; Portugal; Slovenia; Sweden

United Nations Security Council resolution 1194, adopted unanimously on 9 September 1998, after reaffirming resolutions 687 (1991), 707 (1991), 715 (1991), 1060 (1996), 1115 (1997) and 1154 (1998) concerning Iraq's weapons programme, the council condemned Iraq's decision to suspend co-operation with the United Nations Special Commission (UNSCOM) and the International Atomic Energy Agency (IAEA).

On 5 August 1998, the Iraqi government announced that it would no longer co-operate with UNSCOM and the IAEA, and therefore sanctions against Iraq would remain. The country had halted all disarmament activities of UNSCOM and refused to co-operate in any activity relating to its nuclear programme. The council was determined to ensure full compliance by Iraq of its obligations under previous Security Council resolutions, and to allow UNSCOM and the IAEA access to any sites they requested; any attempts to restrict this were unacceptable.

Acting under Chapter VII of the United Nations Charter, the council condemned the Iraqi non-compliance with previous security council resolutions and the memorandum of understanding signed earlier in 1998 and demanded that it withdraw its refusal. It decided not to conduct a review of the sanctions and would not do so until Special Commission and the IAEA were able to conduct the full range of activities within their mandates, including inspections.

== See also ==
- Foreign relations of Iraq
- Iraq and weapons of mass destruction
- Iraq disarmament timeline 1990–2003
- Iraq sanctions
- List of United Nations Security Council Resolutions 1101 to 1200 (1997–1998)
