= United Nations Security Council Resolution 1441 =

2002 UN Security Council resolution regarding Iraqi disarmament

UN Security Council Resolution 1441
- Map of Iraq (green) and Kuwait (orange).
- Date: 8 November 2002
- Meeting no.: 4,644
- Code: S/RES/1441 (Document)
- Subject: The situation between Iraq and Kuwait
- Voting summary: 15 voted for; None voted against; None abstained
- Result: Adopted

Security Council composition
- Permanent members: China; France; Russia; United Kingdom; United States
- Non-permanent members: Bulgaria; Cameroon; Colombia; Guinea; Ireland; Mauritius; Mexico; Norway; Singapore; Syria

United Nations Security Council Resolution 1441 is a United Nations Security Council resolution adopted unanimously by the United Nations Security Council on 8 November 2002, offering Iraq under Saddam Hussein "a final opportunity to comply with its disarmament obligations" that had been set out in several previous resolutions (Resolutions 660, 661, 678, 686, 687, 688, 707, 715, 986, and 1284). The United States used it as part of the legal justification for the subsequent US-led invasion of Iraq.

Resolution 1441 stated that Iraq was in material breach of the ceasefire terms presented under the terms of Resolution 687. Iraq's breaches related not only to weapons of mass destruction (WMD), but also the known construction of prohibited types of missiles, the purchase and import of prohibited armaments, and the continuing refusal of Iraq to compensate Kuwait for the widespread looting conducted by its troops during the 1990–1991 invasion and occupation. It also stated that "...false statements or omissions in the declarations submitted by Iraq pursuant to this resolution and failure by Iraq at any time to comply with, and cooperate fully in the implementation of, this resolution shall constitute a further material breach of Iraq's obligations."

== Passage of resolution ==
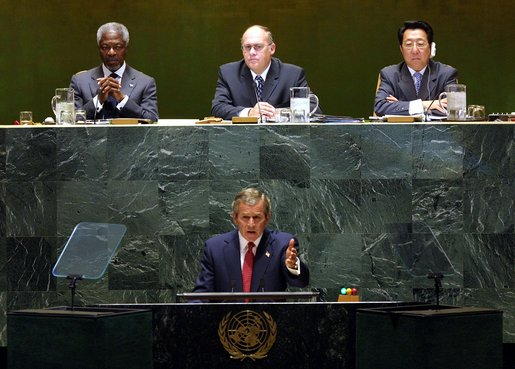
George W. Bush addressed the General Assembly on 12 September 2002 to outline the complaints of the United States against the Iraqi government.

The resolution itself never mentioned a war and only required Iraq to support inspections by UNMOVIC and IAEA.

On 12 September 2002, U.S. President George W. Bush addressed the General Assembly and outlined a catalogue of complaints against the Iraqi government. These included:

- "In violation of Security Council resolution 1373, Iraq supports terrorist organizations that direct violence against Iran, Israel, and Western governments....And al-Qaida [sic] terrorists escaped from Afghanistan are known to be in Iraq."
- The United Nations Commission on Human Rights in 2001 found "extremely grave" human rights violations
- Iraqi production and use of weapons of mass destruction (biological weapons, chemical weapons, and long-range missiles), all in violation of U.N. resolutions.
- Iraq used proceeds from the "oil for food" U.N. program to purchase weapons rather than food for its people.
- Iraq flagrantly violated the terms of the weapons inspection program before discontinuing it altogether.

Following the speech, intensive negotiations began with other members of the Security Council. In particular, three permanent members (with veto power) of the council were known to have misgivings about an invasion of Iraq: Russia, China, and France.

The resolution text was drafted jointly by the United States and the United Kingdom, the result of eight weeks of tumultuous negotiations, particularly with Russia and France. France questioned the phrase "serious consequences" and stated repeatedly that any "material breach" found by the inspectors should not automatically lead to war; instead the UN should pass another resolution deciding on the course of action. In favour of this view is the fact that previous resolutions legitimizing war under Chapter VII used much stronger terms, like "...all necessary means..." in Resolution 678 in 1990 and that Resolution 1441 stated that the Security Council shall "remain seized of the matter."

== Security Council vote ==
On 8 November 2002, the Security Council passed Resolution 1441 by a unanimous 15–0 vote; Russia, China, France, and Syria, the only Arab state, voted in favour, giving Resolution 1441 wider support than even the 1990 Gulf War resolution.

While some politicians have argued that the resolution could authorize war under certain circumstances, the representatives in the meeting were clear that this was not the case. The United States Ambassador to the United Nations, John Negroponte, said:

[T]his resolution contains no "hidden triggers" and no "automaticity" with respect to the use of force. If there is a further Iraqi breach, reported to the Council by UNMOVIC, the IAEA or a Member State, the matter will return to the Council for discussions as required in paragraph 12. The resolution makes clear that any Iraqi failure to comply is unacceptable and that Iraq must be disarmed. And, one way or another, Iraq will be disarmed. If the Security Council fails to act decisively in the event of further Iraqi violations, this resolution does not constrain any Member State from acting to defend itself against the threat posed by Iraq or to enforce relevant United Nations resolutions and protect world peace and security.

The ambassador for the United Kingdom, the co-sponsor of the resolution, said:

We heard loud and clear during the negotiations the concerns about "automaticity" and "hidden triggers" – the concern that on a decision so crucial we should not rush into military action; that on a decision so crucial any Iraqi violations should be discussed by the Council. Let me be equally clear in response... There is no "automaticity" in this resolution. If there is a further Iraqi breach of its disarmament obligations, the matter will return to the Council for discussion as required in paragraph 12. We would expect the Security Council then to meet its responsibilities.

The message was further confirmed by the ambassador for Syria:

Syria voted in favour of the resolution, having received reassurances from its sponsors, the United States of America and the United Kingdom, and from France and Russia through high-level contacts, that it would not be used as a pretext for striking against Iraq and does not constitute a basis for any automatic strikes against Iraq. The resolution should not be interpreted, through certain paragraphs, as authorizing any State to use force. It reaffirms the central role of the Security Council in addressing all phases of the Iraqi issue.

== Implementation ==
Iraq agreed to the Resolution on 13 November. Weapons inspectors returned on 27 November, led by Hans Blix of UNMOVIC and Mohamed ElBaradei of the International Atomic Energy Agency. The inspectors had been absent from Iraq since December 1998 when they were withdrawn immediately prior to Operation Desert Fox.

Inspectors began visiting sites where WMD production was suspected, but found no evidence of such activities, except for 18 undeclared 122mm chemical rockets that were destroyed under UNMOVIC supervision. As was discovered after the invasion of Iraq, no production of WMDs was taking place, and no stockpiles existed. U.N. inspectors also found that the Al-Samoud 2 and Al-fatah missiles violated U.N. range restrictions, the former also being partially destroyed under UNMOVIC supervision. Debate about Resolution 1441 therefore turns on whether, despite the absence of WMDs and the acceptance of inspections, Iraq failed to comply with the terms of the Resolution, and whether an invasion was justified in the absence of any further UN Security resolutions on the subject.

On 7 December 2002, Iraq filed its 12,000-page weapons declaration with the UN in order to meet requirements for this resolution. The five permanent members of the Security Council received unedited versions of the report, while an edited version was made available for other UN Member States. On 19 December, Hans Blix reported before the United Nations and stated in regards to Iraq's 7 December report (unedited version): "During the period 1991–1998, Iraq submitted many declarations called full, final and complete. Regrettably, much in these declarations proved inaccurate or incomplete or was unsupported or contradicted by evidence. In such cases, no confidence can arise that proscribed programmes or items have been eliminated." By March, Blix declared that 7 December report had not brought any new documentary evidence to light.

Iraq continued to fail to account for substantial chemical and biological stockpiles which UNMOVIC inspectors had confirmed as existing as late as 1998. Iraq claimed that it had disposed of its anthrax stockpiles at a specific site, but UNMOVIC found this impossible to confirm since Iraq had not allowed the destruction to be witnessed by inspectors as required by the pertinent Resolutions. Chemical testing done at the site was unable to show that any anthrax had been destroyed there.

Hans Blix and Mohamed ElBaradei presented several reports to the UN detailing Iraq's level of compliance with Resolution 1441. On 27 January 2003 Chief UN Weapons Inspector Blix addressed the UN Security Council and stated "Iraq appears not to have come to a genuine acceptance–not even today–of the disarmament, which was demanded of it and which it needs to carry out to win the confidence of the world and to live in peace." Blix went on to state that the Iraqi regime had allegedly misplaced "1,000 tonnes" of VX nerve agent—one of the most toxic ever developed.

By mid-February the issues of anthrax, the nerve agent VX and long-range missiles remained unresolved. Blix's 7 March report stated "Iraq, with a highly developed administrative system, should be able to provide more documentary evidence about its proscribed weapons programmes. Only a few new such documents have come to light so far and been handed over since we began inspections."

Blix's report also stated:

What are we to make of these activities? One can hardly avoid the impression that, after a period of somewhat reluctant cooperation, there has been an acceleration of initiatives from the Iraqi side since the end of January. This is welcome, but the value of these measures must be soberly judged by how many question marks they actually succeed in straightening out. This is not yet clear. Against this background, the question is now asked whether Iraq has cooperated "immediately, unconditionally and actively" with UNMOVIC, as required under paragraph 9 of resolution 1441 (2002). The answers can be seen from the factual descriptions I have provided. However, if more direct answers are desired, I would say the following:

The Iraqi side has tried on occasion to attach conditions, as it did regarding helicopters and U-2 planes. Iraq has not, however, so far persisted in these or other conditions for the exercise of any of our inspection rights. If it did, we would report it.

It is obvious that, while the numerous initiatives, which are now taken by the Iraqi side with a view to resolving some long-standing open disarmament issues, can be seen as "active", or even "proactive", these initiatives 3–4 months into the new resolution cannot be said to constitute "immediate" cooperation. Nor do they necessarily cover all areas of relevance. They are nevertheless welcome and UNMOVIC is responding to them in the hope of solving presently unresolved disarmament issues.

At this point, the US Administration asserted that Iraq remained in material breach of the UN Resolutions, and that, under 1441, this meant the Security Council had to convene immediately "in order to consider the situation and the need for full compliance with all of the relevant Council resolutions in order to secure international peace and security".

Before the meeting took place, French president Jacques Chirac declared on 10 March that France would veto any resolution which would automatically lead to war. This caused open displays of dismay by the U.S. and British governments. The drive by Britain for unanimity and a "second resolution" was effectively abandoned at that point.

In the leadup to the meeting, it became apparent that a majority of UNSC members would oppose any resolution leading to war. As a result, no such resolution was put to the council.

At the Azores Summit of 16 March, Tony Blair, George W. Bush, Spanish prime minister José María Aznar as well as Portuguese prime minister José Manuel Barroso who hosted the meeting, announced the imminent deadline of 17 March for complete Iraqi compliance, with statements such as "Tomorrow is a moment of truth for the world". On the 17th, speeches by Bush and UK Foreign Secretary Jack Straw explicitly declared the period of diplomacy to be over, as declared by Resolution 1441's prohibition on giving Iraq new opportunities for compliance, and that no further authorization from the UN would be sought before an invasion of Iraq (see 2003 invasion of Iraq). The US and Britain, while admitting that such a resolution was diplomatically desirable, insisted that Iraq had now been given enough time (noting also the time since the first disarmament resolutions of 1991) to disarm or provide evidence thereof, and that war was legitimized by 1441 and previous UN resolutions. Non-permanent Security Council member Spain declared itself with the US and Britain. Nevertheless, this position taken by the Bush administration and its supporters, has been and still is being disputed by numerous legal experts. According to most members of the Security Council, it is up to the council itself, and not individual members, to determine how the body's resolutions are to be enforced.

== Aftermath ==
After the invasion, the Bush administration commissioned the Iraq Survey Group to determine whether in fact any WMD existed in Iraq. After a year and half of meticulously searching the country, the inspectors reported:

While a small number of old, abandoned chemical munitions have been discovered, ISG judges that Iraq unilaterally destroyed its undeclared chemical weapons stockpile in 1991. There are no credible indications that Baghdad resumed production of chemical munitions thereafter, a policy ISG attributes to Baghdad's desire to see sanctions lifted, or rendered ineffectual, or its fear of force against it should WMD be discovered.

The review was conducted by Charles A. Duelfer and the Iraq Survey Group. In October 2004, Bush said of Duelfer's analysis: "The chief weapons inspector, Charles Duelfer, has now issued a comprehensive report that confirms the earlier conclusion of David Kay that Iraq did not have the weapons that our intelligence believed were there."

== See also ==
- 2003 invasion of Iraq
- Al-Anfal Campaign
- Criticism of the Iraq War
- Invasion of Kuwait
- Iran–Iraq War
- Jus ad bellum
- List of United Nations Security Council Resolutions 1401 to 1500 (2002–2003)
- Mass graves in Iraq
