= United Nations Security Council Resolution 1134 =

UN Security Council Resolution 1134
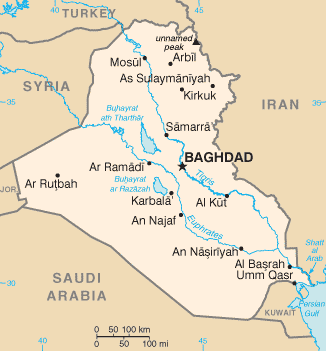
- Iraq
- Date: 23 October 1997
- Meeting no.: 3,826
- Code: S/RES/1134 (Document)
- Subject: The situation between Iraq and Kuwait
- Voting summary: 10 voted for; None voted against; 5 abstained
- Result: Adopted

Security Council composition
- Permanent members: China; France; Russia; United Kingdom; United States
- Non-permanent members: Chile; Costa Rica; Egypt; Guinea-Bissau; Japan; Kenya; South Korea; Poland; Portugal; Sweden

United Nations Security Council resolution 1134, adopted on 23 October 1997, after recalling resolutions 687 (1991), 707 (1991), 715 (1991), 1060 (1996) and 1115 (1997) on the monitoring of Iraq's weapons programme, the Council demanded that Iraq co-operate with weapons inspection teams from the United Nations Special Commission (UNSCOM) and expressed its intention to impose travel bans on Iraqi officials in the event of non-compliance.

The council noted that, since the adoption of Resolution 1115, there were incidents where inspection teams from UNSCOM were denied access to sites and persons by the Government of Iraq. It stated that such incidents were unacceptable, and warned of further measures if this continued. Nevertheless, the commission made progress in the termination of Iraq's weapons of mass destruction programme.

Acting under Chapter VII of the United Nations Charter, the council condemned the refusal of Iraqi authorities to allow access by United Nations inspectors to sites and persons it requested, as well as endangering the safety of UNSCOM and the removal or destruction of documents of interest. It concluded that the obstruction constituted violations of previous Security Council resolutions and demanded that Iraq co-operate with UNSCOM in allowing it access to sites and persons it requested. In the event of non-compliance, then all countries were to deny access to Iraqi officials on their territory. The resolution decided to begin the creation a list of officials to whom the travel ban would apply if the measures were implemented.

Resolution 1134 was adopted by 10 votes to none against and five abstentions from China, Egypt, France, Kenya and Russia, who were opposed to different aspects of the resolution. China and Russia expressed reservations about the practicality of imposing sanctions; and Egypt, France and Kenya wished to further discuss proposals and amendments before the resolution was put to vote.

== See also ==
- Foreign relations of Iraq
- Gulf War
- Invasion of Kuwait
- Iraq and weapons of mass destruction
- Iraq disarmament timeline 1990–2003
- Iraq sanctions
- List of United Nations Security Council Resolutions 1101 to 1200 (1997–1998)
