= United Nations Security Council Resolution 1284 =

UN Security Council Resolution 1284
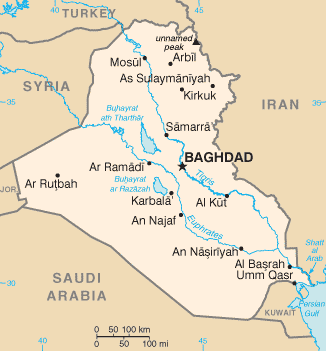
- Iraq
- Date: 17 December 1999
- Meeting no.: 4,084
- Code: S/RES/1284 (Document)
- Subject: The situation between Iraq and Kuwait
- Voting summary: 11 voted for; None voted against; 4 abstained
- Result: Adopted

Security Council composition
- Permanent members: China; France; Russia; United Kingdom; United States
- Non-permanent members: Argentina; Bahrain; Brazil; Canada; Gabon; Gambia; Malaysia; Namibia; Netherlands; Slovenia

United Nations Security Council resolution 1284, adopted on 17 December 1999, after recalling previous relevant resolutions on Iraq, including resolutions 661 (1990), 687 (1991), 699 (1991), 707 (1991), 715 (1991), 986 (1995), 1051 (1996), 1153 (1998), 1175 (1998), 1242 (1999) and 1266 (1999), the council established the United Nations Monitoring, Verification and Inspection Commission (UNMOVIC) to replace the United Nations Special Commission (UNSCOM). It was the final resolution adopted in 1999.

Resolution 1284 was adopted by 11 votes to none against and four abstentions from China, France, Malaysia and Russia. Iraq rejected the resolution, particularly as it did not meet its requirement for the lifting of sanctions imposed in 1990. Despite the adoption of the resolution, it did not lead to the return of United Nations weapons inspectors or changes in the humanitarian programme.

== Resolution ==
=== Observations ===
The security council recalled the provisions of Resolution 715 which approved plans by the secretary-general and director general of the International Atomic Energy Agency (IAEA) for future ongoing monitoring and verification of Iraq's weapons programme. It recalled the aim for the Middle East to be free of weapons of mass destruction and for a global ban on the use of chemical weapons. Furthermore, it was concerned about the humanitarian situation in Iraq, and that not all property and refugees from Kuwait had returned. Iraq had made progress towards complying with Resolution 687 but the conditions did not yet exist for the council to lift the prohibitions in that resolution.

=== Acts ===
Resolution 1284 was divided into four sections, all of which were enacted under Chapter VII of the United Nations Charter which made the provisions legally enforceable.

==== A ====
In the first part of the resolution, the security council established UNMOVIC and would undertake the responsibilities of UNSCOM. It demanded that Iraq allow UNMOVIC immediate, unconditional and unrestricted access to any given area, installation, equipment, documents or person. The Secretary-General Kofi Annan was requested to appoint a chairman of UNMOVIC within 30 days. An organisational plan for UNMOVIC was requested to be submitted within 45 days, while both UNMOVIC and the IAEA were directed to draw up a work programme for the discharge of their mandates within 60 days of both organisations starting their work. Iraq would be liable for the costs of both.

==== B ====
Section B addressed the repatriation of Kuwaiti and third country nationals from Iraq, and the council reminded Iraq to co-operate with the International Committee of the Red Cross in this regard. The secretary-general was requested to report every four months on progress made towards the repatriation of Kuwaiti or third country nationals (or their remains), and every six months on the return of Kuwaiti property and national archives.

==== C ====
Countries were permitted to import an unlimited amount of petroleum and petroleum products from Iraq consistent with the Oil-for-Food Programme established in Resolution 986, where there had previously been a limit on imports. The committee established in Resolution 661 was requested to appoint a group of experts to approve contracts to accelerate Iraq's export of petroleum and petroleum products. For an initial period of six months, the Council suspended measures relating to payments made by Iraq of 10 million United States dollars towards losses and damages to Kuwait following its invasion by Iraq.

The secretary-general was requested to maximise the benefits of arrangements set out in Resolution 986 including the enhancement of the humanitarian aid programme for the Iraqi people and provide daily updates on the escrow account. The security council further decided that Hajj pilgrimage flights were excluded from the provisions of Resolutions 661 and 670. It also called on Iraq to ensure that all relief supplies were distributed correctly, particularly to vulnerable groups, and to continue demining work. In addition, the Secretary-General was asked to establish a group of experts to find out how Iraq's oil production could be increased, for example by bringing in foreign oil companies.

==== D ====
The resolution concluded with the council stating that if Iraq was complying with UNMOVIC, the IAEA and security council resolutions, that it would suspend the ban on import of commodities and products originating in Iraq and prohibitions against the sale, supply and delivery of civilian commodities and products to Iraq, excluding exceptions described in Resolution 687 for a period of 120 days. If Iraq was not co-operating, the prohibitions would be reimposed five days after receiving reports from the Executive Chairman of UNMOVIC and the Director General of the IAEA.

== See also ==
- Foreign relations of Iraq
- Iraq and weapons of mass destruction
- Iraq disarmament timeline 1990–2003
- Iraq sanctions
- List of United Nations Security Council Resolutions 1201 to 1300 (1998–2000)
