= United Nations Security Council Resolution 1205 =

UN Security Council Resolution 1205
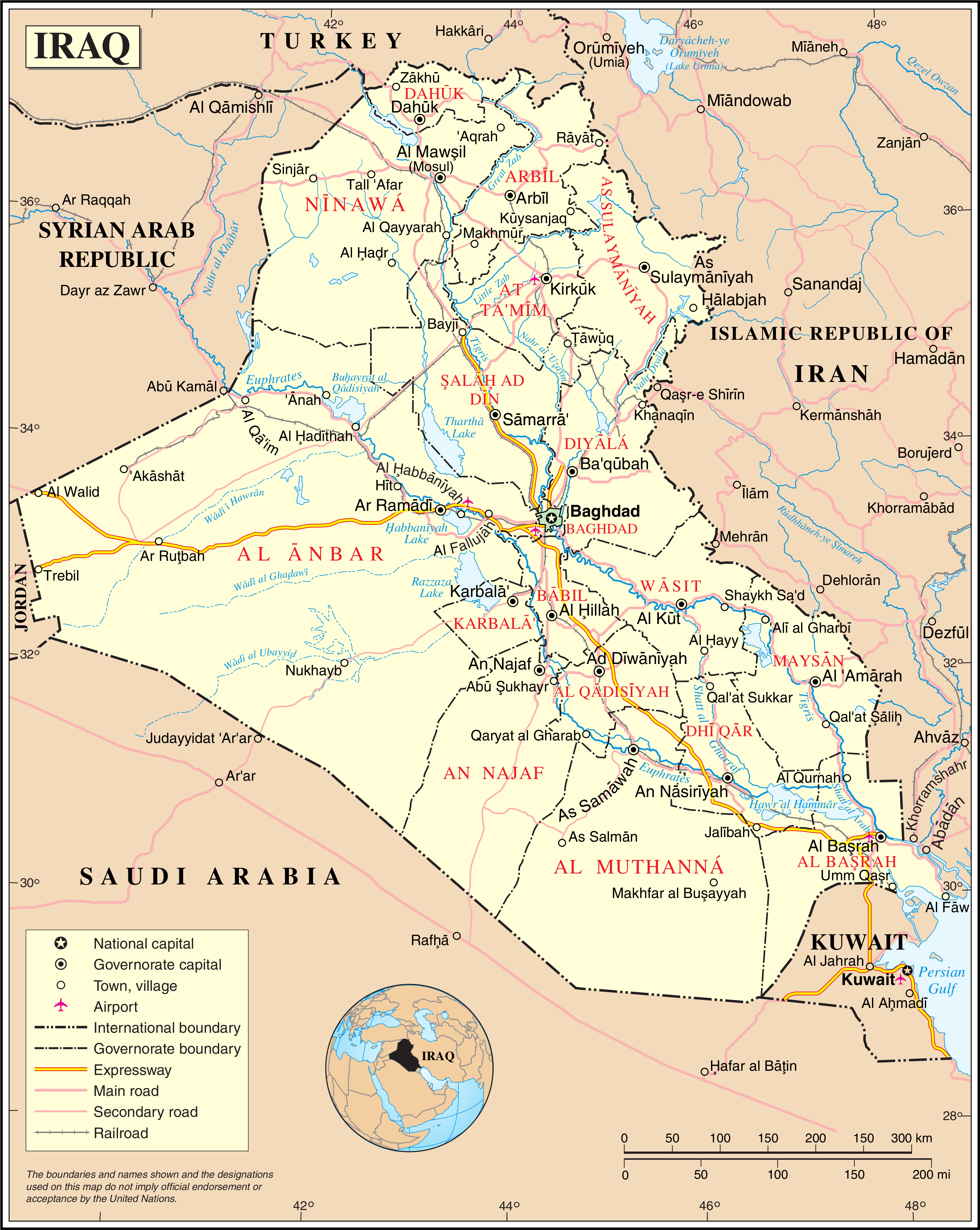
- Iraq
- Date: 5 November 1998
- Meeting no.: 3,939
- Code: S/RES/1205 (Document)
- Subject: The situation between Iraq and Kuwait
- Voting summary: 15 voted for; None voted against; None abstained
- Result: Adopted

Security Council composition
- Permanent members: China; France; Russia; United Kingdom; United States
- Non-permanent members: Bahrain; Brazil; Costa Rica; Gabon; Gambia; Japan; Kenya; Portugal; Slovenia; Sweden

United Nations Security Council resolution 1205, adopted unanimously on 5 November 1998, after recalling all resolutions on Iraq, particularly resolutions 1154 (1998) and 1194 (1998) concerning its weapons programme, the Council condemned Iraq's decision to cease co-operation with the United Nations Special Commission (UNSCOM).

On 31 October 1998 Iraq decided to end co-operation with UNSCOM and continued to place restrictions on the International Atomic Energy Agency (IAEA). The country was required to meet its obligations under Resolution 687 (1991) and that effective co-operation with UNSCOM and the IAEA is essential in this process. It would then consider measures imposed on Iraq once it had rescinded its latest decision.

Acting under Chapter VII of the United Nations Charter, the Council condemned Iraq's decision to no longer co-operate with the Special Commission and IAEA and demanded that it immediately withdraw its decision. The country had previously announced it would suspend co-operation with both on 5 August 1998. Until Iraq complied, the duration of restrictions imposed in Resolution 687 would not be reviewed.

== See also ==
- Foreign relations of Iraq
- Iraq and weapons of mass destruction
- Iraq disarmament timeline 1990–2003
- Sanctions against Iraq
- List of United Nations Security Council Resolutions 1201 to 1300 (1998–2000)
