= Black Rose (organization) =

American BDSM organization

Black Rose logo

Black Rose is a pansexual educational and support group for the BDSM community in the Washington, D.C. area. It was founded in June 1987, was the center of the local BDSM community for almost 20 years, and continues to this day. Jack McGeorge was one of its founders.

Black Rose was one of the founding coalition partners of the National Coalition for Sexual Freedom, which was founded in 1997.

From 1997 through 2012, the organization held hotel-based conventions that included educational sessions, vendor rooms and play parties. For much of that time, the events were annual and by 2000 had grown to be among the largest such events held on the East Coast. Annual events continued through 2009. The group's last large event was held in 2012 to celebrate its 25th anniversary.

In 1998, Black Rose X received the Large Event of the Year award as part of the Pantheon of Leather Awards. Also, in 1998 and 2000, Black Rose received the Large Club of the Year award as part of the Pantheon of Leather Awards.

Over Thanksgiving weekend, in 2002, an article in The Washington Post publicly highlighted Black Rose cofounder Jack McGeorge's leadership in the Washington, DC BDSM and leather community. McGeorge had made no attempt to conceal his involvement in the BDSM and leather lifestyles; his full name appeared prominently on websites, and he said as much to the Post and other media. He did, however, offer his resignation to Hans Blix, hoping to preserve the credibility of his organization (the UN Monitoring, Verification and Inspection Commission, called UNMOVIC) before the weapons inspections in Iraq. Blix refused to accept McGeorge's resignation. Later, Hua Jiang, spokeswoman for U.N. Secretary General Kofi Annan, said that being into BDSM was no more likely to be a cross-cultural problem in the Middle East than any number of other issues.

The increased prominence of the internet, and especially the founding of the social networking site Fetlife in 2008, allowed alternative sexuality groups to multiply and flourish. This diminished Black Rose's central position in the Washington BDSM community, although it remains a significant presence. It is an especially important resource for newcomers to BDSM, for whom its educational emphasis is both practical and less intimidating than other points of entry.

Black Rose hosts regular educational classes addressing BDSM activities, issues, and safety, currently at The Crucible, Washington's longstanding BDSM club, in Washington, DC. For most of its history, the group has also hosted monthly socials whose emphasis have varied over time from hands-on educational workshops to social play parties.

Black Rose is governed by a board of directors elected by its membership.

== Special interest groups ==
Black Rose includes several special interest groups (SIGs):

- Bondage
- Cultural, Arts & Theatre Social (CATS)
- Domination & Submission (D/s)
- Hypnosis
- New and Curious Kinksters (NaCK)
- Tethers and Feathers, for those interested in tickling

== Awards ==
Among its other activities, Black Rose annually grants awards:

- Jack McGeorge Excellence in Education
- Membership Service Award

== Similar organizations ==
- TES (New York City)
- Society of Janus (San Francisco)
- Portland Leather Alliance (Oregon)
