= United Nations Security Council Resolution 1115 =

UN Security Council Resolution 1115
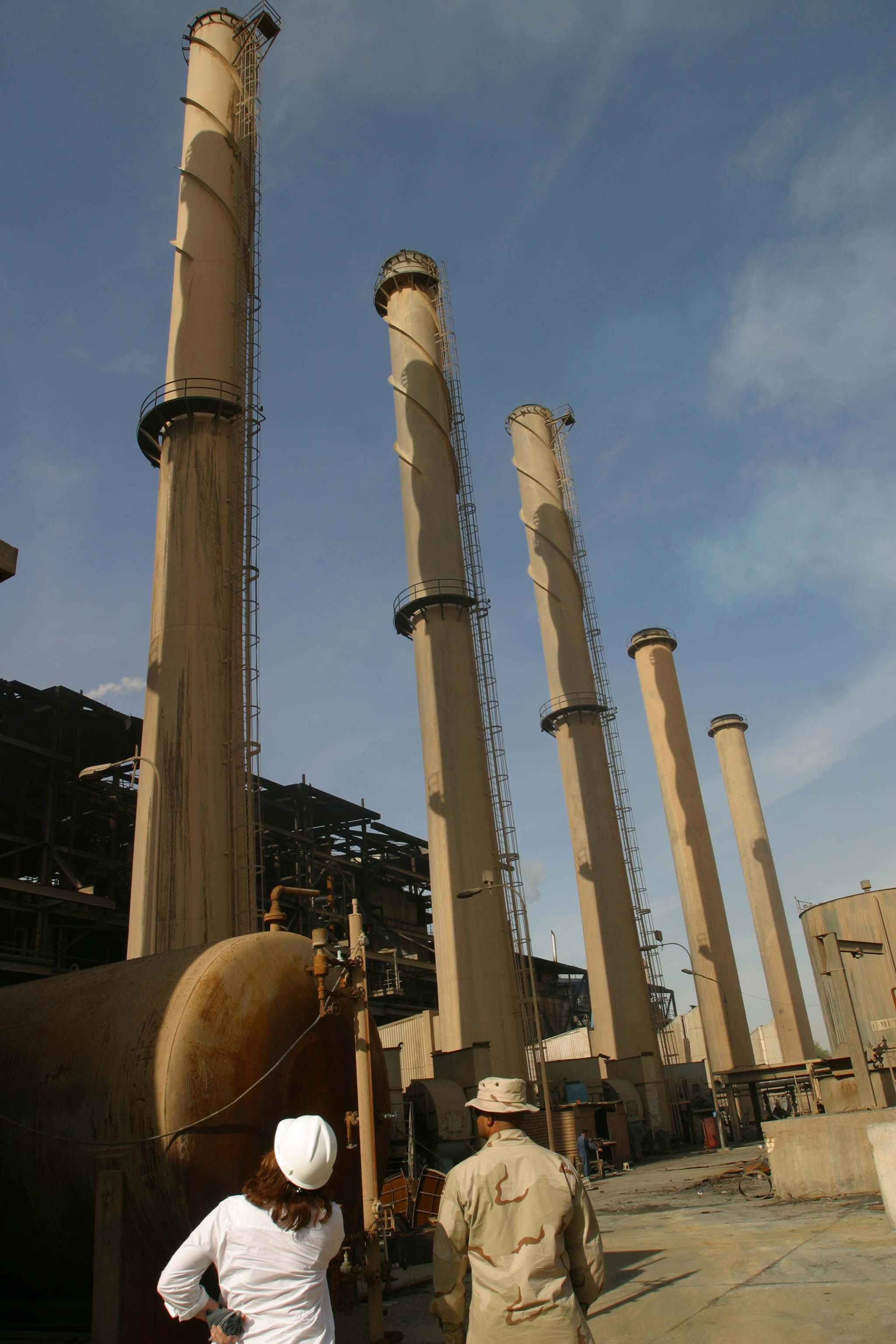
- Monitors inspecting an Iraqi power plant
- Date: 21 June 1997
- Meeting no.: 3,792
- Code: S/RES/1115 (Document)
- Subject: The situation between Iraq and Kuwait
- Voting summary: 15 voted for; None voted against; None abstained
- Result: Adopted

Security Council composition
- Permanent members: China; France; Russia; United Kingdom; United States
- Non-permanent members: Chile; Costa Rica; Egypt; Guinea-Bissau; Japan; Kenya; South Korea; Poland; Portugal; Sweden

United Nations Security Council resolution 1115, adopted unanimously on 21 June 1997, after reaffirming resolutions 687 (1991), 707 (1991), 715 (1991) and 1060 (1996) on the monitoring of Iraq's weapons programme, the Council demanded that Iraq co-operate with weapons inspection teams from the United Nations Special Commission (UNSCOM) and allow unrestricted access to any areas and equipment the teams requested.

Noting unacceptable restrictions on weapons inspectors, the Security Council announced its determination to permit immediate unconditional and unrestricted access the Special Commission to any site it wished.

Acting under Chapter VII of the United Nations Charter, the resolution condemned the refusal of the Iraqi authorities to allow access to sites designated by the Special Commission, in violation of previous Security Council resolutions. It demanded that Iraq co-operate with the Special Commission, allowing it to access any site and or person they wanted to interview. The Chairman of the Special Commission was requested to provide reports, in accordance with Resolution 1051 (1996) on Iraq's compliance with the current resolution. It also suspended the 60-day review of sanctions until UNSCOM's October 1997 report. Should Iraq not comply, further action would be taken against non-compliant Iraqi officials.

== See also ==
- Foreign relations of Iraq
- Gulf War
- Invasion of Kuwait
- Iraq and weapons of mass destruction
- Iraq disarmament timeline 1990–2003
- Sanctions against Iraq
- List of United Nations Security Council Resolutions 1101 to 1200 (1997–1998)
