= Jack McGeorge =

American secret service agent and leather culture activist

- McGeorge speaking on a PBS panel as a munitions specialist in 1999
- Born: Harvey John McGeorge II; September 29, 1949
- Died: August 18, 2009 (aged 59)
- Occupations: United States Marine, United States Secret Service specialist, BDSM activist
- Employer(s): United States Secret Service; United Nations Monitoring, Verification and Inspection Commission (UNMOVIC)
- Organization(s): Black Rose; National Coalition for Sexual Freedom
- Known for: Munitions analysis, BDSM advocacy and education
- Awards: Pantheon of Leather Mid-Atlantic Regional Award (1998, 2000); Pantheon of Leather Man of the Year (2004); Leather Hall of Fame (2021, posthumous); Centurion Award (Leather Archives & Museum)

Harvey John "Jack" McGeorge II (September 29, 1949 – August 18, 2009) was a Marine, a Secret Service Specialist, and a munitions analyst for the U.N. Monitoring, Verification and Inspection Commission (UNMOVIC), as well as being a frequently recognized regional leader for BDSM advocacy and education.

In 2000, on the strength of his published work and demonstrated expertise, McGeorge was offered the opportunity to defend his knowledge of the weaponization of biological and chemical agents before a panel of the Academic Council of the State Research Institute for Organic Chemistry and Technology in Moscow, for which he was awarded an honorary doctorate degree.

He was a founder of Black Rose, an officer of the Leather Leadership Conference, a Director of the National Coalition for Sexual Freedom, and a Chairman of the Community-Academic Consortium for Research on Alternative Sexualities.

McGeorge died in August 2009 as a complication of open heart surgery.

== Public disclosure of BDSM activism ==
Over Thanksgiving weekend, 2002, an article in the Washington Post publicly highlighted McGeorge's leadership in the Washington, DC BDSM and leather community.

McGeorge had made no attempt to conceal his involvement in the BDSM and leather lifestyles; his full name appeared prominently on websites, and he said as much to the Post and other media. He did, however, offer his resignation to Hans Blix, hoping to preserve the credibility of his organization (the U.N. Monitoring, Verification and Inspection Commission, called UNMOVIC) before the weapons inspections in Iraq. Blix refused to accept McGeorge's resignation.

Later, Hua Jiang, spokeswoman for U.N. Secretary General Kofi Annan, said that being into BDSM was no more likely to be a cross-cultural problem in the Middle East than any number of other issues.

== Recognition ==
In 1998 and 2000 McGeorge received the Mid-Atlantic Regional Award as part of the Pantheon of Leather Awards; in 2000 he tied for that award with Jonathan Krall.

The Pantheon of Leather named McGeorge their Man of the Year in 2004.

In 2009 McGeorge posthumously received the first Master Jack McGeorge Excellence in Education Award from the Master/slave Conference.

In 2021 McGeorge was inducted into the Leather Hall of Fame.

The Leather Archives and Museum gave him their Centurion Award.

Black Rose established The Jack McGeorge Excellence in Education Award, to recognize "an individual who has consistently provided exemplary educational service to, and for, the betterment of Black Rose, its members, and the greater national community over a number of years."

The Leather Leadership Conference established the Jack McGeorge Scholarship.
