= At the Center of the Storm =

2007 memoir by George Tenet with Bill Harlow

At the Center of the Storm: My Years at the CIA
- Book cover
- Author: George Tenet with Bill Harlow
- Language: English
- Subject: Central Intelligence Agency
- Genre: Memoir
- Publisher: HarperCollins
- Publication date: April 30, 2007
- Publication place: United States
- Media type: Hardcover
- Pages: 576
- ISBN: 0-06-114778-8
- OCLC: 71163669
- Dewey Decimal: 327.12730092 B 22
- LC Class: JK468.I6 T42 2007

At the Center of the Storm: My Years at the CIA is a memoir co-written by former Director of the Central Intelligence Agency George Tenet with Bill Harlow, former CIA Director of Public Affairs. The book was released on April 30, 2007 and outlines Tenet's version of 9/11, the war on terrorism, the 2001 War in Afghanistan, the run-up to the 2003 Iraq war, rough interrogation and other events.

== 60 Minutes interview ==
On April 29, 2007, Tenet was interviewed about his memoir on 60 Minutes II. Tenet outlined the content of his book including allegations that are contrary to the George W. Bush administration positions.

== Criticism ==
- Tenet faced accusations of hypocrisy from former espionage officials on the book's release date, for not speaking out earlier against the White House's push to invade Iraq.
- Former Secretary of State Condoleezza Rice disputes Tenet's claim that the Bush administration, before the U.S. led invasion of Iraq in March 2003, never had a serious debate about whether Iraq posed an imminent threat or whether to tighten existing sanctions.
- CIA veteran Michael Scheuer stated, "Sadly but fittingly, 'At the Center of the Storm' is likely to remind us that sometimes what lies at the center of a storm is a deafening silence."
- Robert Baer, author and former CIA field officer assigned to the Middle East states, "It's not that Tenet is responsible for getting us into Iraq. It's that he failed in not making a full disclosure to Congress and the White House that we were taking a leap into a bottomless black abyss. He should have resigned when he realized Bush would use bad intelligence to deceive the American people. This is what we get when we have a politicized CIA director."
- Douglas Feith, a former Under Secretary of Defense for Policy, whom Tenet criticizes in his book, states: "The problem with George Tenet is that he doesn't seem to care to get his facts straight. He is not meticulous. He is willing to make up stories that suit his purposes and to suppress information that does not." In reference to Tenet's error regarding Richard Perle (see below), Feith wrote that "The date, the physical descriptions, the quotation marks are all, in the words of Gilbert and Sullivan's 'Mikado,' merely corroborative detail, intended to give artistic verisimilitude to an otherwise bald and unconvincing narrative." The memoir, Feith said, "... does offer insight into Mr. Tenet. It allows you to hear the way he talked—fast, loose, blustery, emotional, imprecise, from the 'gut.' Mr. Tenet proudly refers to the guidance of his 'gut' several times in the book—a strange boast from someone whose stock-in-trade should be accuracy and precision."

== Erratum ==
- A key conversation with then Pentagon advisor Richard Perle on September 12, 2001, in which Tenet claims Perle told him that "Iraq had to pay for the attack" could not have occurred as Perle was stranded in Paris and did not return to Washington, D.C. until three days later; however, in an interview with CNN's Wolf Blitzer during an episode of The Situation Room Perle admitted that the two men indeed crossed each other one morning, as claimed by Tenet, but only later in the same week and not on September 12.

== See also ==
- 2001 anthrax attacks
- Abu Ghraib prison
- Command responsibility
- Extraordinary rendition
- Governments' positions pre-2003 invasion of Iraq
- Guantanamo Bay detention camp
- Homeland Security Act
- Iraq and weapons of mass destruction
- Iraq disarmament crisis
- Legitimacy of the 2003 invasion of Iraq
- Plausible deniability
- Public relations preparations for 2003 invasion of Iraq
- UN Security Council and the Iraq war
- Unlawful combatant
- USA PATRIOT Act
- Views on the 2003 invasion of Iraq
- Waterboarding
