= Criticism of the Iraq War =

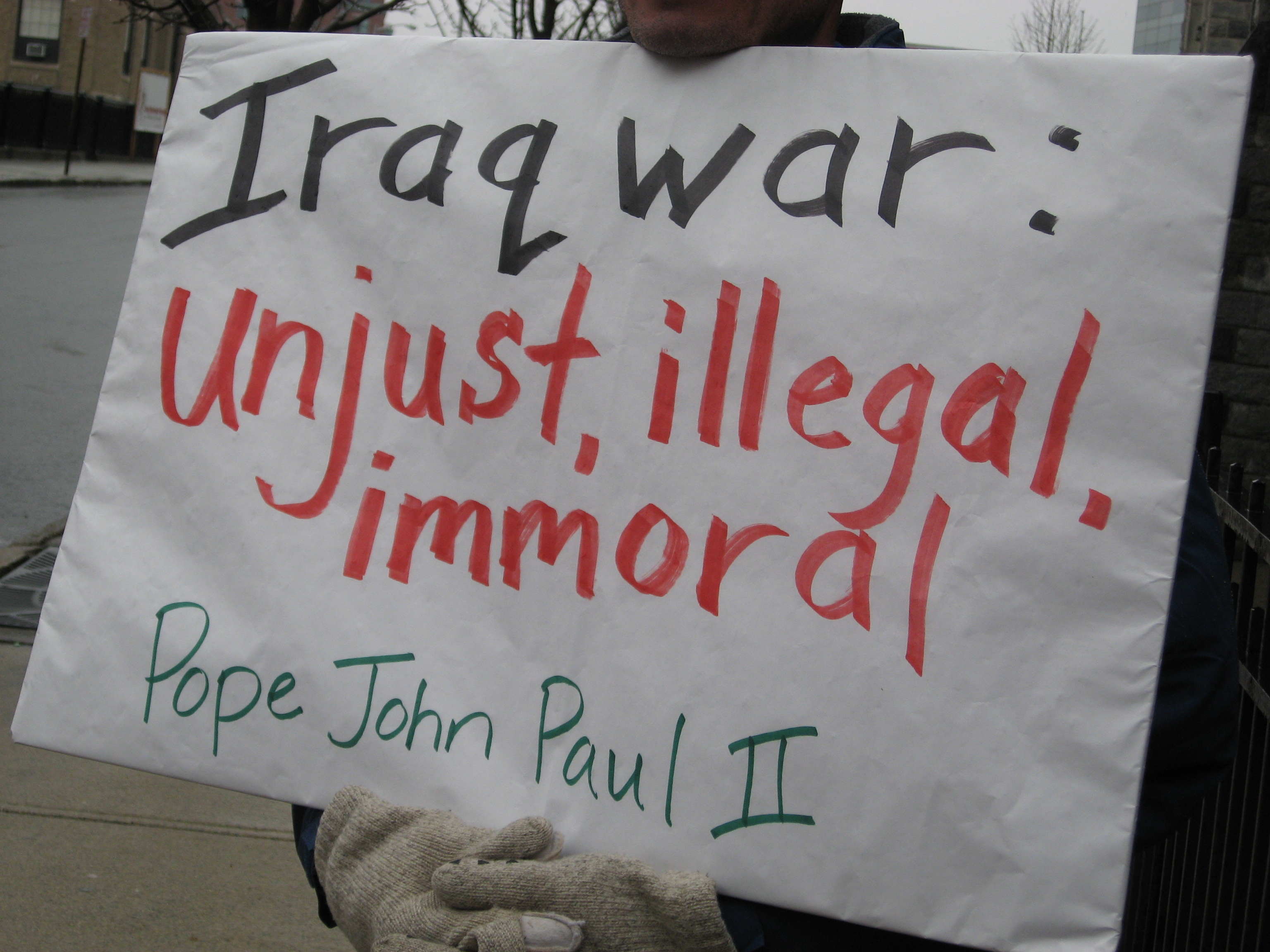
A protester holding a sign quoting Pope John Paul II, which reads "Iraq war: unjust, illegal, immoral" (March 2008)

The U.S. rationale for the Iraq War has faced heavy criticism from an array of popular and official sources both inside and outside the United States. Putting this controversy aside, both proponents and opponents of the invasion have also criticized the prosecution of the war effort along a number of lines. Most significantly, critics have assailed the U.S. and its allies for not devoting enough troops to the mission, not adequately planning for post-invasion Iraq, and for permitting and perpetrating widespread human rights abuses. As the war has progressed, critics have also railed against the high human and financial costs.

Some academics see such costs as inevitable until US foreign policy turns away from expanding US hegemony. Professor Chip Pitts asserts that an American empire exists, but argues that it is profoundly at odds with better instincts of US citizens and policymakers, and that rejecting neo-colonialism by military means as employed in the Iraq War is a prerequisite to restoring domestic civil liberties and human rights that have been infringed upon by an imperial presidency – while crucial, as well, to promoting peace and stability in the Middle East and other places of vital US interest. The Center for Public Integrity alleges that President Bush's administration made a total of 935 false statements in a two-year period about Iraq's alleged threat to the United States.

== Government expenditures ==
A British investigation (Panorama, 9 June 2008) estimates that around $23 billion (£11.75 billion) may have been lost, stolen or not properly accounted for in Iraq.

The United States Department of Justice has imposed gagging orders that prevent further investigation.

== International law ==
The use of force by a state is prohibited by Article 2 (4) of the UN Charter. The only exceptions are with Security Council authorization under Chapter VII, which was not obtained, or in self-defense against an armed attack by another state under Article 51. The US government stated that an armed attack by Iraq did occur against the US and its coalition partners as demonstrated by the assassination attempt on former US President George H. W. Bush in 1993 and firing on coalition aircraft enforcing the no-fly zones over Northern and Southern Iraq since the 1991 Gulf War ceasefire agreement. Under Article 51 of the UN Charter, the US reserved the right to self-defense, even without a UN mandate, as were the cases in the bombing of Iraq in June 1993 in retaliation for Hussein's attempt on former President Bush's life and again in 1996 in retaliation for Hussein's targeting of American aircraft patrolling the no-fly zones over Northern and Southern Iraq and the launching of a major offensive against the city of Irbil in Iraqi Kurdistan in violation of UNSC Resolution 688 prohibiting repression of Iraq's ethnic minorities.

On September 16, 2004 Kofi Annan, the secretary general of the United Nations, said of the invasion, "I have indicated it was not in conformity with the UN charter. From our point of view, from the charter point of view, it was illegal."

Furthermore, before the invasion even the then UK Attorney General, Lord Goldsmith, advised that the war would likely be illegal for several reasons including the lack of a Security Council resolution. He later changed his mind when it appeared that the invasion would take place regardless of the legal situation.

Even prominent supporters of the war have accepted that it was illegal. Richard Perle, a hawkish member of the Pentagon has stated that "international law ... would have required us to leave Saddam Hussein alone."

On the day Resolution 1441 was passed, the US ambassador to the UN, John Negroponte, assured the Security Council that there were no "hidden triggers" with respect to the use of force, and that in the event of a "further breach" by Iraq, resolution 1441 would require that "the matter will return to the Council for discussions as required in paragraph 12." However, he then added: "If the Security Council fails to act decisively in the event of further Iraqi violations, this resolution does not constrain any Member State from acting to defend itself against the threat posed by Iraq or to enforce relevant United Nations resolutions and protect world peace and security."

== Troop levels ==
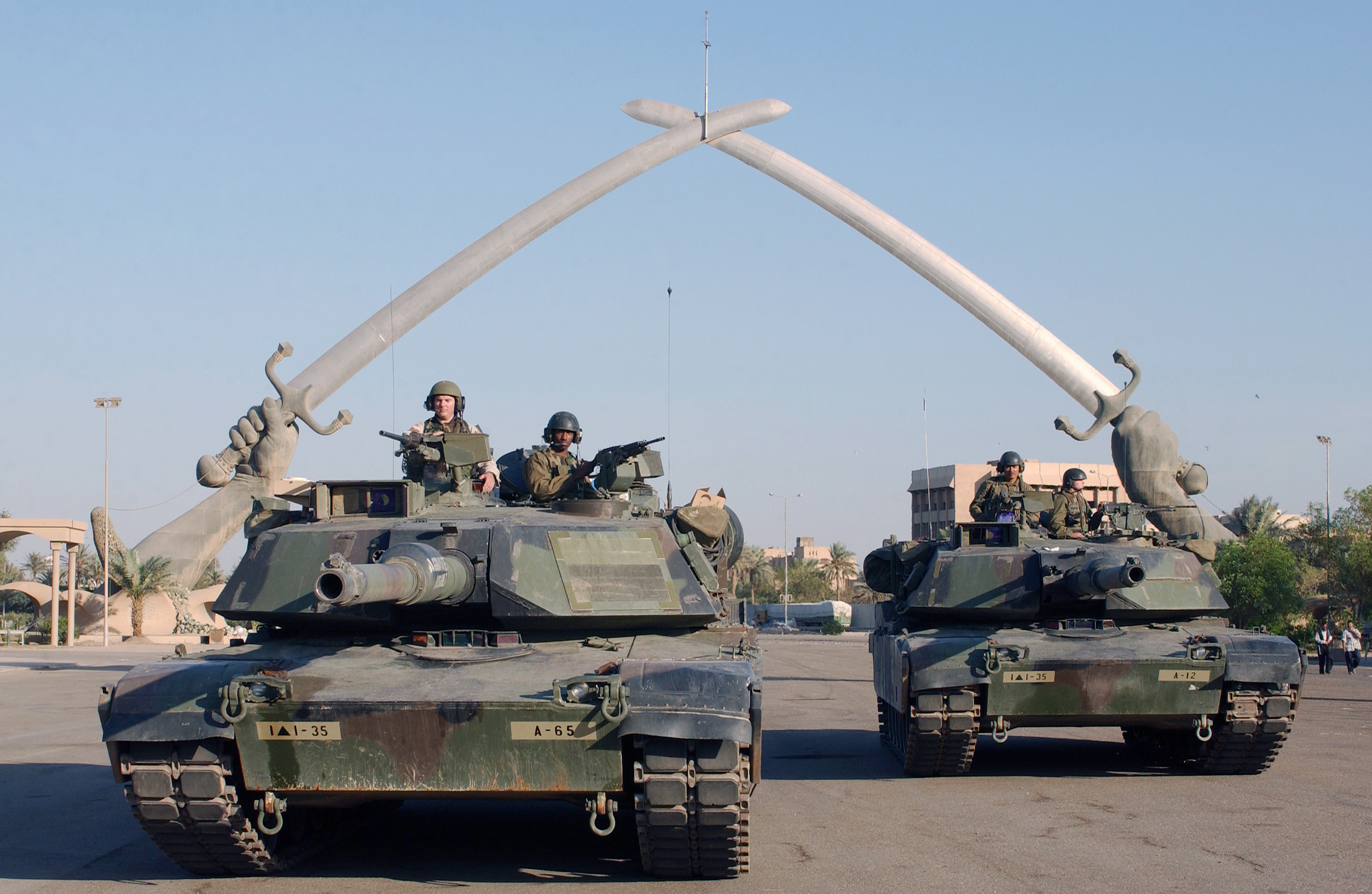
M1A1 Abrams pose for a photo under the "Hands of Victory" in Ceremony Square, Baghdad, Iraq.

The troop level for the initial invasion of Iraq was controversial throughout the run-up to the war, particularly among U.S. military personnel. In 1999, then head of United States Central Command Marine General Anthony Zinni (ret.) organised a series of war games known as Desert Crossing to assess an invasion aimed at unseating Saddam Hussein. His plan, which predicted much of the violence and instability that followed the actual invasion, called for a force of 400,000 troops. Consistent with the Desert Crossing scenarios, the original U.S. army plan for the invasion of Iraq contemplated troop levels of up to 500,000, but Secretary of Defense Donald Rumsfeld declared this plan "the product of old thinking and the embodiment of everything that was wrong with the military", and decided on an invasion force of approximately 130,000, bolstered by some 45,000 British troops and a handful from other nations. The plan to invade with a smaller force was publicly questioned by then Army Chief of Staff General Eric Shinseki, who, during a February 25, 2003 Senate Armed Services Committee hearing, suggested that an invasion force would be "on the order of several hundred thousand soldiers." In a November 15, 2006, hearing of the same committee, General John Abizaid, then head of U.S. Central Command, confirmed that "General Shinseki was right that a greater international force contribution, U.S. force contribution and Iraqi force contribution should have been available immediately after major combat operations."

== Post-invasion plans ==
In addition to raising questions about troop levels, critics of the Iraq War have argued that the U.S. planning for the post-invasion period was "woefully inadequate." In particular, critics have argued that the U.S. was unprepared for the widespread looting and the violent insurgency that immediately followed the invasion. Soon after the invasion, former U.S. Deputy Secretary of Defense Paul Wolfowitz, a proponent of the invasion, acknowledged that the U.S. made assumptions related to the insurgency that "turned out to underestimate the problem." Pre-war beliefs about the occupation were inherently rosy, with Vice President Cheney noting on "Meet the Press" that U.S. forces would be "greeted as liberators". Subsequent reports have indicated that oversights such as the failure to control access to the Qa'qaa munitions factory in Yusufiyah allowed large quantities of munitions to fall into the hands of Al-Qaeda.

The U.S. plans for reconstructing Iraq have also come under heavy fire. In a February 2006 report, Stuart W. Bowen Jr., the Special Inspector General for Iraq Reconstruction, wrote that: "There was insufficient systematic planning for human capital management in Iraq before and during the U.S.-directed stabilisation and reconstruction operations." Critics have particularly chastised the Pentagon, which was charged with preparing for the post-invasion period, for largely ignoring a $5 million study entitled the Future of Iraq Project, which the U.S. State Department compiled in the year preceding the invasion. In a 2013 report, the Watson Institute at Brown University concluded that, as the report was described by Daniel Trotta for Reuters, "the $212 billion reconstruction effort was largely a failure with most of that money spent on security or lost to waste and fraud".

== Human and financial costs ==
As the Iraq War progressed from the relatively short invasion period to the considerably longer and more costly occupation, many critics argued that the war was no longer worth the growing number of casualties among both U.S. soldiers and Iraqi civilians. For example, the U.S. organisation Gold Star Families for Peace, launched by anti-war activist Cindy Sheehan and other parents of soldiers killed in Iraq and other wars, advocated "bringing an end to the occupation of Iraq" by raising "awareness in the United States about the true human costs of the invasion/occupation of Iraq."

Just as the human costs mounted, the total financial costs also rose from the initial Bush administration estimates of $50 billion to more than $400 billion total, most of it coming from the United States, but at least £4 billion from the United Kingdom. As the war bill grew, many U.S. politicians, including some who supported the invasion, begun to argue its cost outweighed its benefits, and that it was jeopardizing the preparedness of the U.S. military. For example, on March 29, 2007, Nebraska senators and longtime rivals Chuck Hagel (R-NE) and Ben Nelson (D-NE) released a joint statement saying that "there is now a 'significant' risk that the United States military will not be able to respond to an emerging crisis."

== Effect on global war on terror ==
During the run-up to the invasion a group of 33 international relations scholars took out a full-page ad in The New York Times suggesting, among other things, that invading Iraq would distract the United States from its fight against al-Qaeda and further destabilize the Middle East.

Former British Prime Minister Tony Blair was advised prior to the invasion, "that the greatest terrorist threat to Western interests came from al-Qaeda and related groups, and that this threat would be heightened by military action against Iraq." The International Institute for Strategic Studies agreed, saying in late 2003 that the war had swollen the ranks of al-Qaeda and galvanised its will by increasing radical passions among Muslims. Ten years later, a report from the Watson Institute "concluded the United States gained little from the war while Iraq was traumatized by it. The war reinvigorated radical Islamist militants in the region, set back women's rights, and weakened an already precarious healthcare system".

In January 2004, an Army War College report said the war diverted attention and resources from the threat posed by Al Qaeda. The report by Jeffrey Record, a visiting research professor at the Strategic Studies Institute of the Army War College, called for downsizing the nebulously defined "war on terrorism" and focusing more narrowly on the threat from Al Qaeda.

== Impact on Israel ==
As early as October 2004, the Jewish Telegraphic Agency reported that Jewish support for the war had declined, due to fears of its negative impact on Israel, as well as the broader controversy.

== Effect on religious minorities ==
After the invasion there was a general lawless state in Iraq which is directly attributable to the invasion. This has allowed some Islamic extremists to take roots in the country and attack people of religious minorities which they consider to be infidels. Among these religious minorities are Assyrians and Mandaeans.

== See also ==
- Chris Hedges
- Iraq Inquiry
- Opposition to the Iraq War
- Stephen Soldz
- The Imperial Presidency by Arthur M. Schlesinger Jr.
- Tomas Young: The Last Letter
