= Desert Crossing 1999 =

Series of war games

"Desert Crossing" 1999 was a series of war games known simply as Desert Crossing that were conducted in late April 1999 by the United States Central Command (CENTCOM), in order to assess potential outcomes of an invasion of Iraq aimed at unseating Saddam Hussein. The games were led by Marine General Anthony Zinni (ret.) "When it looked like we were going in[to the 2003 invasion of Iraq], I called back down to CENTCOM and said, 'You need to dust off Desert Crossing.' They said, 'What's that? Never heard of it.'" . According to Air Force General Victor Renuart, the exercise's conclusions were considered but rejected because they called for an invasion force of three armored divisions, while CENTCOM planners favored a force of only one armored division bolstered by a light infantry division.

== See also ==
Millennium Challenge 2002
