= United Nations Security Council Resolution 1051 =

UN Security Council Resolution 1051
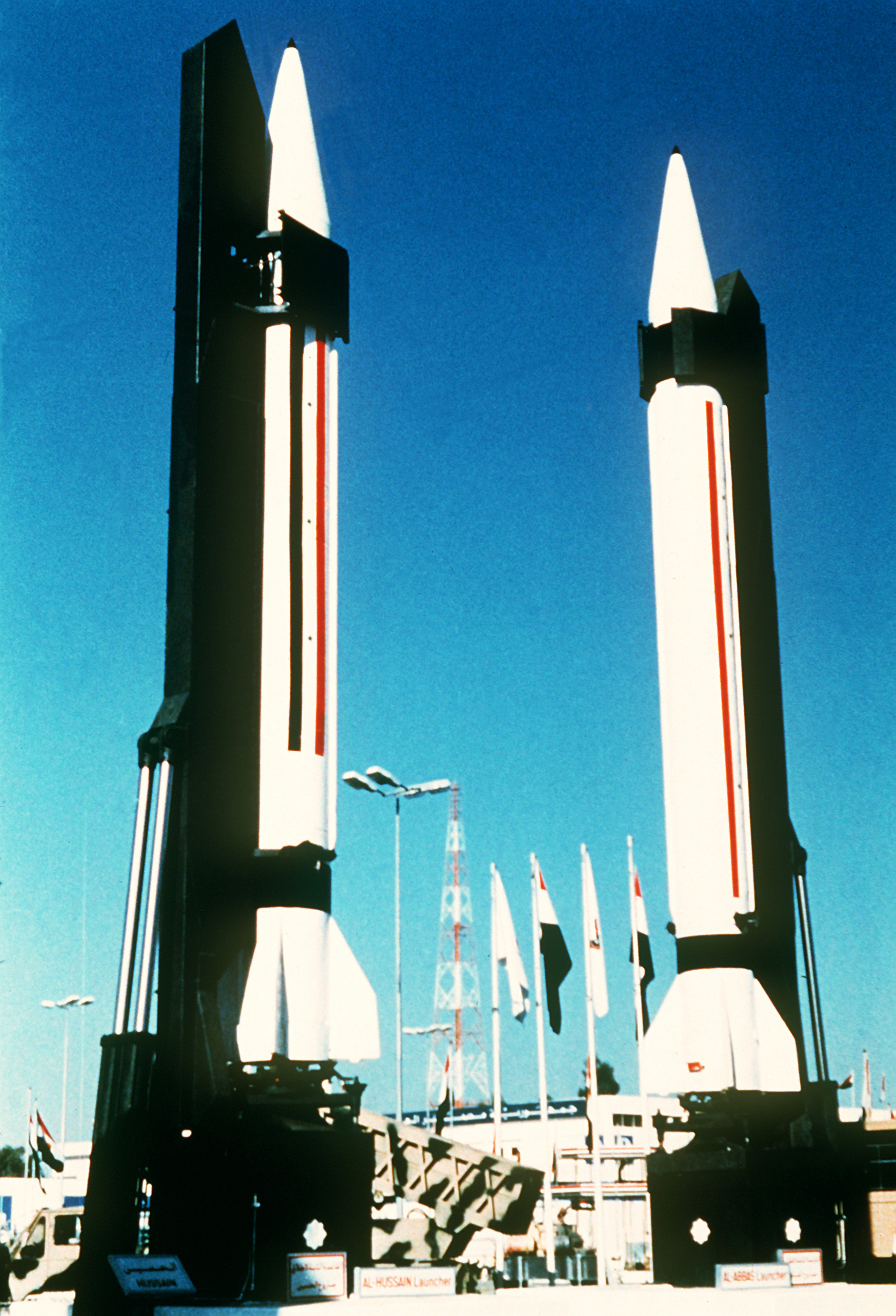
- Iraqi scud missiles (1989)
- Date: 27 March 1996
- Meeting no.: 3,644
- Code: S/RES/1051 (Document)
- Subject: The situation between Iraq and Kuwait
- Voting summary: 15 voted for; None voted against; None abstained
- Result: Adopted

Security Council composition
- Permanent members: China; France; Russia; United Kingdom; United States
- Non-permanent members: Botswana; Chile; Egypt; Guinea-Bissau; Germany; Honduras; Indonesia; Italy; South Korea; Poland

United Nations Security Council resolution 1051 was adopted unanimously on 27 March 1996. After reaffirming resolutions 687 (1991), 707 (1991) and 715 (1991) on the monitoring of Iraq's weapons programme, the Council approved a mechanism for monitoring Iraq's imports and exports of "dual use" items.

The Security Council noted proposals from resolutions 661 (1991), 687 (1991) and 715 (1991) for the United Nations Special Commission and director of the International Atomic Energy Agency (IAEA) to develop a mechanism to monitor Iraqi imports and exports of weapons in a letter received on 7 December 1995.

Acting under Chapter VII of the United Nations Charter, the Security Council approved the proposals in the letter subject to the provisions of the current resolution. It was affirmed that the mechanism would not impair the operation of future or existing non-proliferation agreements, and that other countries' requests for sales to Iraq or Iraqi requests to export items should be addressed to the commission established in Resolution 661.

All countries were asked about arms supplies to Iraq and to submit information to the joint unit of the commission and the IAEA. They were also asked to notify the joint unit of any attempts by companies to circumvent the mechanism, and of any cases where Iraq had not followed procedure. Within 45 days, member states were to be provided with the relevant information from the special commission and director general of the IAEA regarding the implementation of the procedures of the mechanism. The Security Council demanded that Iraq meet all its obligations under the mechanism.

Commencing on 11 April 1996, the Secretary-General Boutros Boutros-Ghali and the director general of the IAEA were required to report periodically on progress every six months.

== See also ==
- Foreign relations of Iraq
- Gulf War
- Invasion of Kuwait
- Iraq and weapons of mass destruction
- Iraq disarmament timeline 1990–2003
- Iraq sanctions
- List of United Nations Security Council Resolutions 1001 to 1100 (1995–1997)
