= United Nations Monitoring, Verification and Inspection Commission =

Organization established by the United Nations 1999–2007

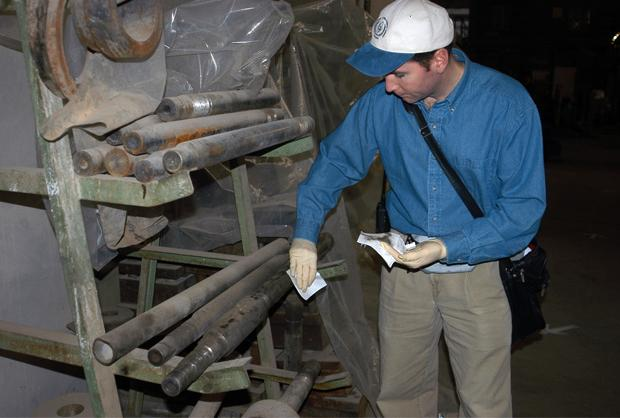
A UN weapons inspector in Iraq in 2002, before the 2003 invasion of Iraq.

The United Nations Monitoring, Verification and Inspection Commission (UNMOVIC) was created through the adoption of United Nations Security Council resolution 1284 of 17 December 1999 and its mission lasted until June 2007.

UNMOVIC was meant to replace the former United Nations Special Commission (UNSCOM) to carry on with the mandate to disarm Iraq of its weapons of mass destruction (WMDs), and to operate a system of ongoing monitoring and verification to check Iraq's compliance with its obligations not to reacquire the same weapons banned by the Security Council.

== Background and UNMOVIC's predecessor UNSCOM ==
UNSCOM was created with the adoption of United Nations Security Council Resolution 687 in April 1991.

Lack of cooperation between UNSCOM and the Iraqi government, plus Saddam Hussein's failure to provide unfettered access to UN arms inspectors, led the United States and the United Kingdom to launch air strikes during Operation Desert Fox. Along with founded suspicion of the CIA interference and infiltration in UNSCOM, military intervention in Iraq in 16–18 December 1998 marked the virtual end of UNSCOM's legitimacy. Those facts led to its closing down and to, at least, one-year hiatus regarding weapon inspections in Iraq.

== UNMOVIC ==
=== Organisation ===
UNMOVIC was created with the adoption of United Nations Security Council Resolution 1284 in December 1999.

In addition to the Office of the Chairman with executive, legal and liaison functions, UNMOVIC comprised four divisions (Planning and Operations, Analysis and Assessment, Information, Technical Support and Training) as well as an administrative service. The Commission maintained its headquarters at the United Nations in New York.

=== Operations ===
In December 1999 UNMOVIC was to take the token and even though Resolution 1284 required its inspection teams allowance to "immediate and unconditional access to any weapons sites and facilities", Iraq rejected the resolution. UNMOVIC could not send inspections to Iraq well into November 2002 after Resolution 1441 was passed.

In 2000, the Secretary-General of the United Nations appointed Dr. Hans Blix of Sweden to be the Commission's Executive Chairman. He served from 1 March 2000 until the end of June 2003, roughly 3 months after Iraq had been invaded.

With no ongoing inspections on the ground in Iraq, political tension escalated in the period 2000-2002 and, in the aftermath of September 11 attacks in 2001 Saddam Hussein's regime in Iraq became the spotlight of the ongoing war on terror policies in Washington.

Following the mandate of the United Nations Security Council Resolution 1441, The president of Iraq, Saddam Hussein, was forced to allow UN inspectors back to his country in November 2002.

UN Resolution 1441 was an actual enhancement of previous United Nations Security Council Resolution 687 and provided: "that Iraq shall provide UNMOVIC and the International Atomic Energy Agency (IAEA) immediate, unimpeded, unconditional, and unrestricted access to any and all, including underground, areas, facilities, buildings, equipment, records, and means of transport which they wish to inspect, as well as immediate, unimpeded, unrestricted, and private access to all officials and other persons whom UNMOVIC or the IAEA wish to interview in the mode or location of UNMOVIC's or the IAEA's choice pursuant to any aspect of their mandates".

Along with IAEA, UNMOVIC led inspections of alleged chemical and biological facilities in Iraq until shortly before the U.S. invasion of Iraq in March 2003.

=== Findings and conclusions ===
UNMOVIC never found any operative weapons of mass destruction in Iraq and although its inspectors were withdrawn in March 2003, continued to operate with respect to those parts of its mandate it could implement outside of Iraq and maintained a degree of preparedness to resume work in Iraq. It maintained a roster of more than 300 experts ready to serve and continued to conduct training.

Its Executive Chairman, Hans Blix, commented in March 2004 that

"in the buildup to the war, Saddam Hussein and the Iraqis were cooperating with UN inspections, and in February 2003 had provided UNMOVIC with the names of hundreds of scientists to interview, individuals Saddam claimed had been involved in the destruction of banned weapons. Had the inspections been allowed to continue, there would likely have been a very different situation in Iraq."

Blix also said that America's pre-emptive, unilateral actions "have bred more terrorism there and elsewhere". He accused President George W. Bush and Prime Minister Tony Blair of acting not in bad faith, but with a severe lack of critical thinking.

The mandate of UNMOVIC was terminated on 29 June 2007.

== See also ==
- Iraq disarmament crisis 1990–2003
- UNMOVIC personnel: Hans Blix, Dimitris Perrikos, Corinne Heraud, Alexander Coker, Jack McGeorge
