= United Nations Security Council Resolution 699 =

UN Security Council Resolution 699
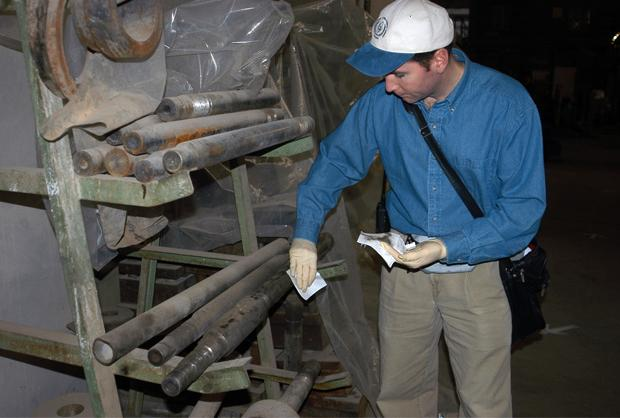
- Weapons inspector in Iraq (2002)
- Date: 17 June 1991
- Meeting no.: 2,994
- Code: S/RES/699 (Document)
- Subject: Iraq
- Voting summary: 15 voted for; None voted against; None abstained
- Result: Adopted

Security Council composition
- Permanent members: China; France; Soviet Union; United Kingdom; United States
- Non-permanent members: Austria; Belgium; Côte d'Ivoire; Cuba; Ecuador; India; Romania; Yemen; Zaire; Zimbabwe

United Nations Security Council resolution 699, adopted unanimously on 17 June 1991, after recalling Resolution 687 (1991) and noting the report by the Secretary-General it requested, the council, acting under Chapter VII, confirmed that the International Atomic Energy Agency and United Nations Special Commission have the authority to undertake weapons inspections in Iraq and to remove, destruct or render the weapons harmless.

The Council requested the Secretary-General to submit a report on the progress of the implementation of the current resolution, and also asked Member States to provide full assistance so that the aforementioned activities are undertaken effectively. However, only US$2 million was contributed by Member States to the commission, a small fraction of what was required. It also decided that the Government of Iraq should be liable for the costs of carrying out the inspections, due to its recent invasion of Kuwait.

== See also ==
- Gulf War
- Invasion of Kuwait
- Iraq and weapons of mass destruction
- Iraq disarmament timeline 1990–2003
- Iraq–Kuwait relations
- Sanctions against Iraq
- List of United Nations Security Council Resolutions 601 to 700 (1987–1991)
