= United Nations Security Council Resolution 1154 =

UN Security Council Resolution 1154
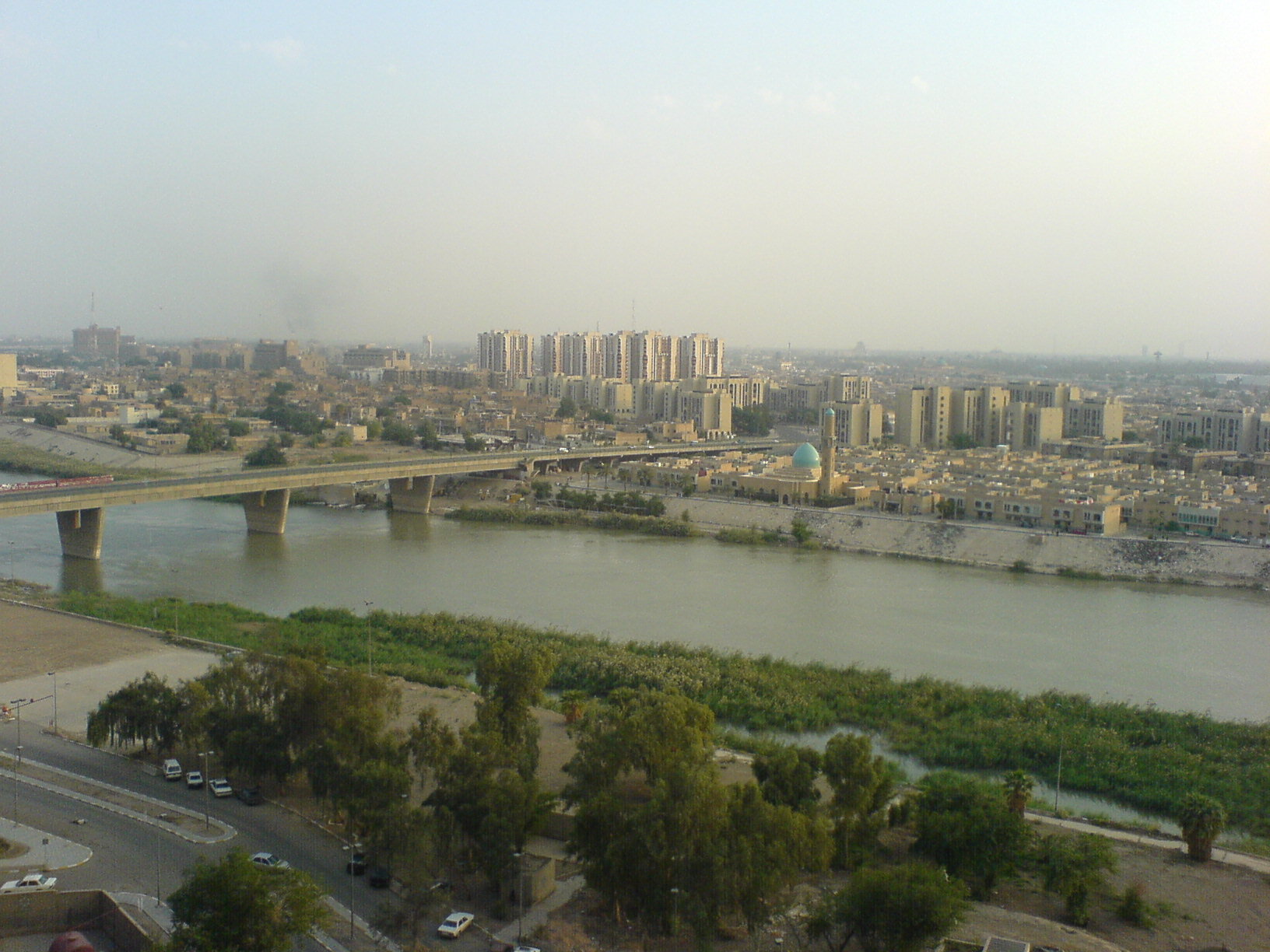
- Iraqi capital Baghdad
- Date: 2 March 1998
- Meeting no.: 3,858
- Code: S/RES/1154 (Document)
- Subject: The situation between Iraq and Kuwait
- Voting summary: 15 voted for; None voted against; None abstained
- Result: Adopted

Security Council composition
- Permanent members: China; France; Russia; United Kingdom; United States
- Non-permanent members: Bahrain; Brazil; Costa Rica; Gabon; Gambia; Japan; Kenya; Portugal; Slovenia; Sweden

United Nations Security Council resolution 1154, adopted unanimously on 2 March 1998, after reaffirming Resolution 687 (1991) and all other relevant resolutions, the Council endorsed a memorandum of understanding signed between the Secretary-General Kofi Annan and the Deputy Prime Minister of Iraq, Tariq Aziz.

Acting under Chapter VII of the United Nations Charter, the Council commended the initiative of the Secretary-General to secure agreements from the Iraqi government on compliance with its obligations under relevant resolutions, and awaited their full implementation. The memorandum established a Special Group consisting of diplomats and members of the United Nations Special Commission (UNSCOM) and International Atomic Energy Agency (IAEA) for the inspection of weapons sites.

The resolution then demanded that Iraq comply with its obligations and allow unconditional and unrestricted access to sites and persons by UNSCOM and IAEA, and that any violation would have severe consequences for the country.

== See also ==
- Foreign relations of Iraq
- Iraq and weapons of mass destruction
- Iraq disarmament timeline 1990–2003
- Sanctions against Iraq
- List of United Nations Security Council Resolutions 1101 to 1200 (1997–1998)
