= United Nations Security Council Resolution 1060 =

UN Security Council Resolution 1060
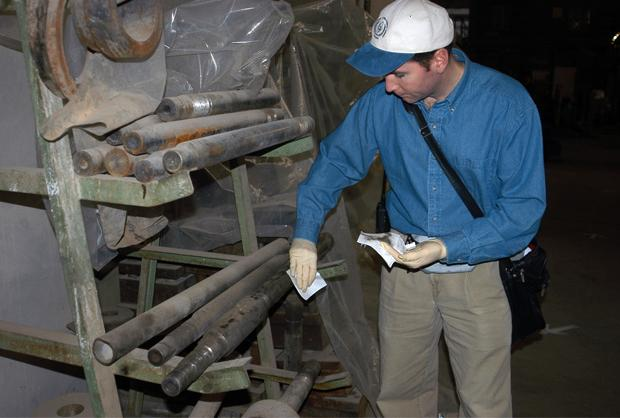
- IAEA weapons inspector in Iraq
- Date: 12 June 1996
- Meeting no.: 3,672
- Code: S/RES/1060 (Document)
- Subject: The situation between Iraq and Kuwait
- Voting summary: 15 voted for; None voted against; None abstained
- Result: Adopted

Security Council composition
- Permanent members: China; France; Russia; United Kingdom; United States
- Non-permanent members: Botswana; Chile; Egypt; Guinea-Bissau; Germany; Honduras; Indonesia; Italy; South Korea; Poland

United Nations Security Council resolution 1060, adopted unanimously on 12 June 1996, after reaffirming resolutions 687 (1991), 707 (1991) and 715 (1991) on the monitoring of Iraq's weapons programme, the Council demanded that Iraq co-operate with weapons inspection teams from the United Nations Special Commission and allow unrestricted access to any areas and equipment the teams requested.

The Security Council took note of the progress of the Special Committee in the elimination of Iraq's programs of weapons of mass destruction and the remaining problems to be resolved. On 11 and 12 June 1996, Iraq denied an inspection team access to certain sites. Resolutions 687, 707 and 715 gave the weapons inspection teams unconditional and unrestricted access to any sites it wished to inspect, and any attempt by Iraq to obstruct that was considered unacceptable by the council.

Acting under Chapter VII of the United Nations Charter, the Council deplored Iraq's refusal to allow access to the sites by weapons inspection teams, in violation of previous Security Council resolutions. It demanded that the teams have access to sites, weapons, equipment and transport it requested and fully supported the work of the Special Commission in this matter.

== See also ==
- Foreign relations of Iraq
- Gulf War
- Invasion of Kuwait
- Iraq and weapons of mass destruction
- Iraq disarmament timeline 1990–2003
- Iraq sanctions
- List of United Nations Security Council Resolutions 1001 to 1100 (1995–1997)
