= United Nations Security Council Resolution 707 =

UN Security Council Resolution 707
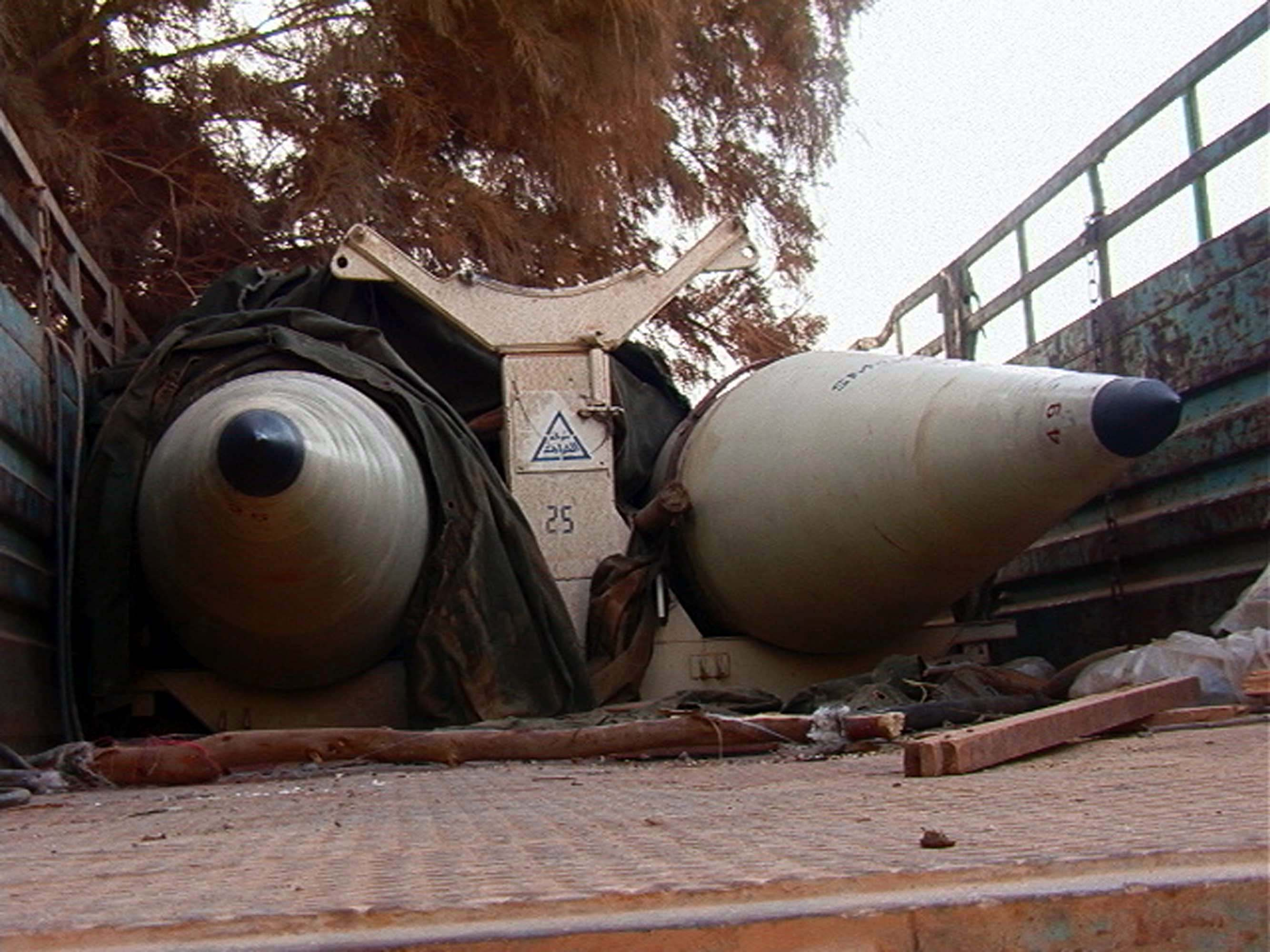
- Iraqi weapons that were ordered to be destroyed
- Date: 15 August 1991
- Meeting no.: 3,004
- Code: S/RES/707 (Document)
- Subject: Iraq
- Voting summary: 15 voted for; None voted against; None abstained
- Result: Adopted

Security Council composition
- Permanent members: China; France; Soviet Union; United Kingdom; United States
- Non-permanent members: Austria; Belgium; Côte d'Ivoire; Cuba; Ecuador; India; Romania; Yemen; Zaire; Zimbabwe

United Nations Security Council Resolution 707, adopted unanimously on 15 August 1991, condemned Iraq for violations and non-compliance of Resolution 687 (1991) and extended powers to the Special Commission and IAEA. It was adopted after recalling Resolution 687 (1991) and hearing representations from the International Atomic Energy Agency (IAEA) and United Nations Special Commission.

In this regard, the council made several demands to the Government of Iraq, demanding that it:

(a) provide "full, final and complete disclosure" of all aspects of its programmes to develop weapons of mass destruction and ballistic missiles with a range of more than 150 kilometres (93 mi), including their components, locations, production facilities and all other nuclear programmes;
(b) allow the IAEA and Special Commission unrestricted access to areas they wish to inspect, including to those they were denied access;
(c) cease attempts to conceal, remove or destroy its nuclear, chemical or biological weapons or ballistic missile programmes;
(d) allow the Special Commission and IAEA to conduct surveillance and inspection flights across the country, also for the purposes of aerial surveying;
(e) halt nuclear activities of any kind, excluding those for agricultural, industrial or medical purposes;
(f) guarantee the safety and immunity of all Special Commission and IAEA representatives, providing transport for them when necessary;
(g) respond to all questions or requests from the IAEA and Special Commission.

Resolution 707 stated that Iraq must comply with the above provisions without delay, and with those in the Nuclear Non-Proliferation Treaty with which it was currently violating.

== See also ==
- Foreign relations of Iraq
- Gulf War
- Iraq and weapons of mass destruction
- Iraq disarmament timeline 1990–2003
- Sanctions against Iraq
- List of United Nations Security Council Resolutions 701 to 800 (1991–1993)
- United Nations Security Council Resolution 715
