= United Nations Security Council Resolution 715 =

UN Security Council Resolution 715
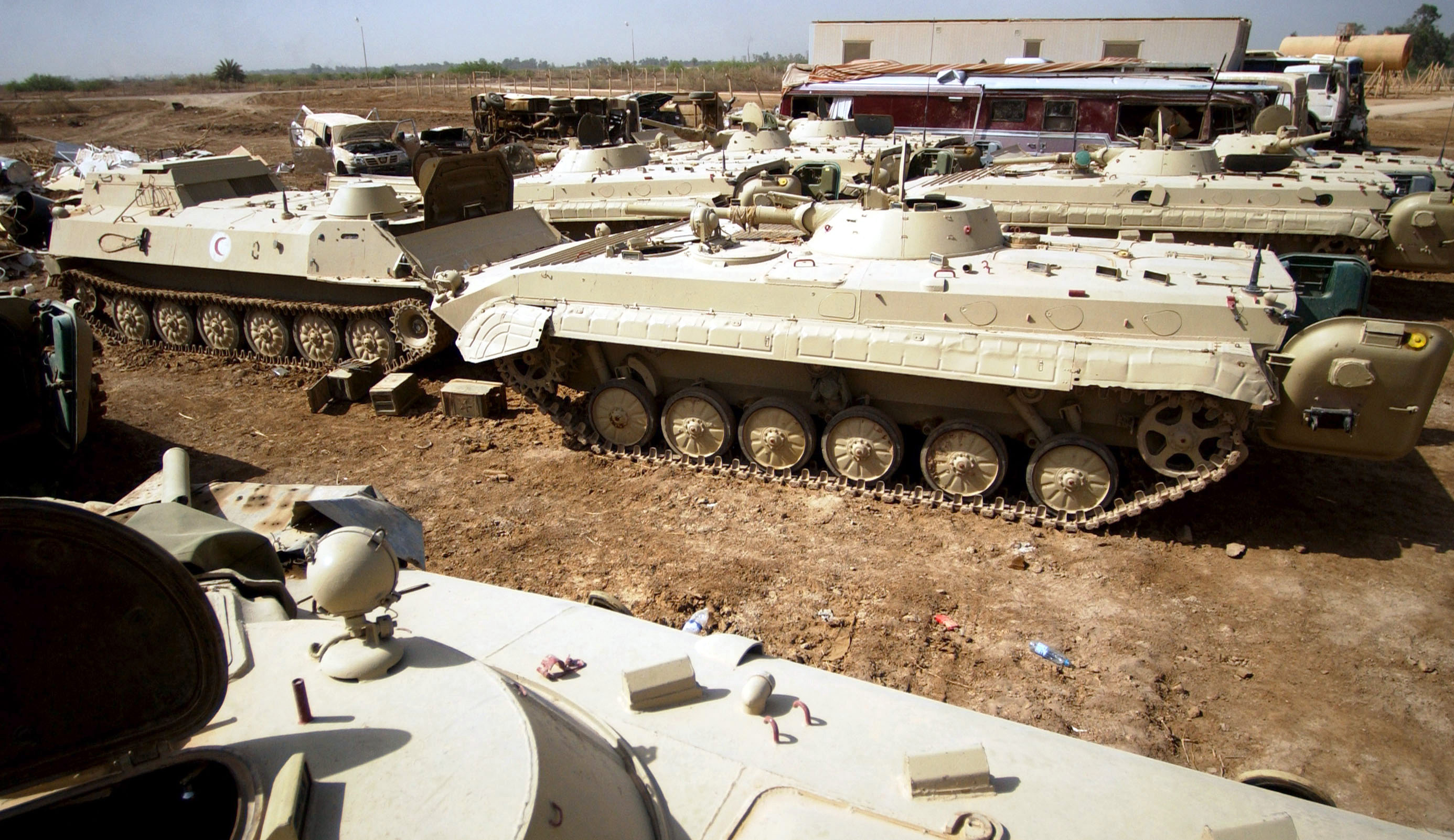
- Iraqi tanks
- Date: 11 October 1991
- Meeting no.: 3,012
- Code: S/RES/715 (Document)
- Subject: Iraq
- Voting summary: 15 voted for; None voted against; None abstained
- Result: Adopted

Security Council composition
- Permanent members: China; France; Soviet Union; United Kingdom; United States
- Non-permanent members: Austria; Belgium; Côte d'Ivoire; Cuba; Ecuador; India; Romania; Yemen; Zaire; Zimbabwe

United Nations Security Council resolution 715, adopted unanimously on 11 October 1991, after recalling resolutions 687 (1991) and 707 (1991), the council, acting under Chapter VII of the United Nations Charter, approved plans from the International Atomic Energy Agency (IAEA) and Secretary-General Javier Pérez de Cuéllar regarding the long-term monitoring of Iraq's weapons programme, requiring it to submit "on-going monitoring and verification" of the country's dual-use facilities.

The council also decided that the United Nations Special Commission, as a subsidiary of the Security Council, would continue to have the right to designate locations to inspect, co-operate with the IAEA and perform other functions in order to allow the full implementation of the current resolution. It also demanded Iraq comply with the resolution and unconditionally meet its obligations, co-operating with the IAEA and Special Commission throughout the inspection process.

The resolution also called for "maximum assistance" financially and otherwise, from Member States in order to support the Special Commission and Director-General of the IAEA in carrying out their activities. It requested the Security Council Committee, established in Resolution 661 (1990), in conjunction with the Special Commission and IAEA develop a mechanism for monitoring future sales of weapons (arms, biological, chemical, nuclear weapons or military equipment). The council also required the Secretary-General and IAEA Director-General report on the implementation of the new plans at least every six months after the adoption of the current resolution.

Iraq, which had rejected such resolutions previously or agreed only in principle, fully accepted the provisions of Resolution 715 on 26 November 1993.

== See also ==
- Gulf War
- Invasion of Kuwait
- Iraq and weapons of mass destruction
- Iraq disarmament timeline 1990–2003
- Sanctions against Iraq
- List of United Nations Security Council Resolutions 701 to 800 (1991–1993)
