= The Sword and the Ship =

1966 book

- Author: Abdulrahman Al-Rabie
- Language: Arabic
- Publisher: Al-Gaith publishing house
- Publication date: 1966
- Publication place: Iraq

The Sword and the Ship (Arabic: السيف والسفينة) is a story collection by the Iraqi writer and artist Abdul Rahman Majeed al-Rubaie and published in 1966 by Al-Gahith publishing house and written in Arabic. Abdulrahman was born in 1939 in the south of Iraq.

== Content ==
The Sword and the Ship is a story collection by Abdulrahman consisting of 110 pages, and it is the first of the writer's literary works. It was republished later in 1979 by Al-Talia publishing house in Lebanon. In this book, the writer studies the Egyptian situation that was rapidly changing after the 25 January revolution, which opened the horizons of organized political and party actions. There were many different purposes for this book, as it is a brief introduction to modern concepts such as the scene and systems of political life, and it is not saturated with detail, but spontaneous.

== About the author ==
Abdulrahman Majid Al-Rabie was born in Al-Nasra in the south of Iraq. He studied in King Faisal school and later in the Institute of Fine Arts in Baghdad. He work as a teacher and worked in the diplomatic field in Lebanon and Tunisia. After a career full of art and teaching art, Abdulrahman moved to journalism and writing. He wrote approximately 20 literary works and novels and one thousand poems and produced studies on various topics.

== Other work ==
Other literary works by the writer:

- The shadow in the head, published in 1968
- Faces from the fatigue journey, published in 1974
- Mouths, published in 1979
- Rivers, published in 1974
