= Timeline of the 2003 invasion of Iraq =

This is a timeline of the events surrounding the United States-led invasion of Iraq in 2003.

Coalition invasion route: The majority of US and British invasion forces approached Iraq from the south en route to Baghdad.

== March 16 ==
- U.S. Special Operations Forces enter Iraq on long-range desert mobility missions to infiltrate into the country and raid key objectives along the border with Saudi Arabia.

== March 17 ==
U.S. President George W. Bush addresses the world about U.S. intentions regarding Saddam Hussein and Iraq on March 17, 2003.

- U.S. President George W. Bush delivers a televised address to the world, in which he summarizes the past few months' events between the United States and Iraq. He demands that Saddam Hussein vacate his office and leave Iraq within two days, or else the U.S. and its allies will invade Iraq and depose his regime.
- In the United Kingdom, Leader of the House of Commons Robin Cook resigns in protest of Prime Minister Tony Blair's support of the American invasion.

== March 18 ==
Protests against a possible invasion of Iraq begin to take place around the world.

- In Australia, a "NO WAR" slogan is painted on the Sydney Opera House by protesters. This comes as Australia's Prime Minister John Howard announced he will commit troops to any American-led war against Iraq. A former Navy officer burns his uniform outside Australia's Parliament House.
- In Denmark, protestors hurl red paint at Prime Minister Anders Fogh Rasmussen for his pro-U.S. stance shortly before a press conference.
- In the United Kingdom, Tony Blair survives a rebellion within his own party to win parliamentary support of war actions in Iraq, in which 159 Labour Members of Parliament vote against the government.

== March 19 ==
President George W. Bush addresses the world on the evening of March 19, 2003 to announce that the U.S. has invaded Iraq.

The Iraqi flag as it was in March 2003.

The Iraqi coat of arms as it was in March 2003.

- As anti-war protests continue, Greenpeace demonstrators chain themselves to the gates of the Australian prime minister's residence, The Lodge.

== March 20 ==
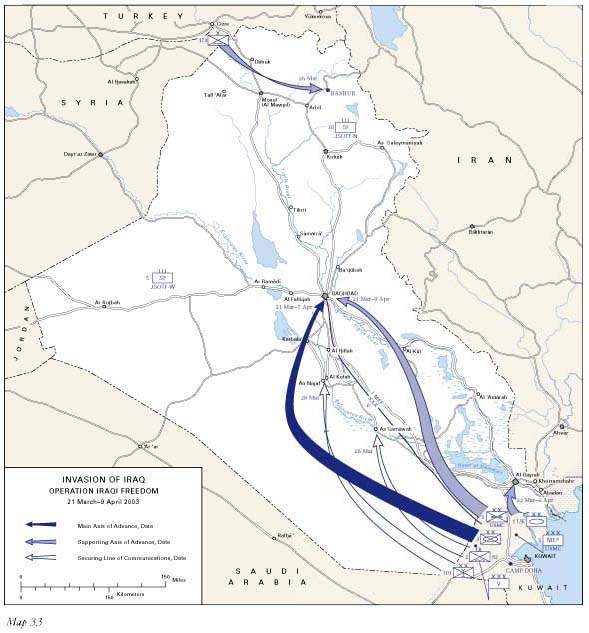
Map of the route of the advance by U.S. and allied forces

The first assaults on Baghdad begin shortly following the 01:00 UTC expiry of the United States' 48-hour deadline for Iraqi President Saddam Hussein and his sons to leave Iraq.

- 02:30 UTC: Explosions are reported in Baghdad, damaging civilian buildings. The United States Department of Defense later states that the assault consisted of 36 Tomahawk missiles and two F-117-launched GBU-27 bombs, and that the target was a military bunker thought to contain high-level Iraqi regime officials, including Saddam Hussein himself. Later, on May 29, CBS Evening News reports that the bunker never existed.
- 03:15 UTC (March 19 U.S. time): U.S. President George W. Bush states that he ordered the coalition to launch an "attack of opportunity" against specified targets in Iraq. The military action was dubbed "Operation Iraqi Freedom".
- Iraqi state television broadcasts an address from Iraqi leader Saddam Hussein. The U.S. and the British analyze the footage closely, believing that one of his body doubles may have made the speech. However, the U.S. eventually says it believes the address was indeed delivered by Saddam Hussein himself. It has not yet been ascertained when the address was recorded, however. Speculation begins that Saddam Hussein may have been killed. However, these reports are deemed to be false.
- It is announced that special operations forces are operating inside Iraq. Australia, the United Kingdom, and the United States all have special operations forces in the area. Soon after the strike on Baghdad, Iraq launches a number of missiles at targets in Kuwait, including at the coalition forces stationed there. 2-3 Scud missiles are also intercepted. The coalition report that they caused no damage. Later in the day, both British and U.S. ground troops move into the demilitarized zone between Iraq and its neighbor, Kuwait, and then into Iraq itself. During the night, 12 British military personnel and four American troops are killed when a transport helicopter crashes.

== March 22 ==
- Airstrikes on Baghdad continue, with the attacks now concentrated on the city's outskirts.
- Around midnight UTC (early morning local time), reports indicate that 1,500 Turkish troops had moved into northern Iraq. The intervention of Turkish troops had been opposed by the U.S. government. The German government has announced that it will call back the German AWACS personnel watching NATO airspace above Turkey if Turkish troops engage in fights in northern Iraq. Turkey later denies they moved troops into Iraq.
- At 1:15 (UTC), a collision of two Royal Navy Westland Sea King helicopters from HMS Ark Royal over the Persian Gulf kills six Britons and one American.
- At 10:00 UTC, it is reported that U.S. forces are attempting to capture the city of Basra, and are involved in a major tank battle on the western side of the city.
- Kurdish officials report a U.S. missile attack on territory held by the Kurdish Islamist group Ansar al-Islam.
- According to Iraqi regime reports, two civilians are killed and 207 wounded, consisting of mostly women and children. They claim that there have been no defections or surrenders of Iraqi soldiers, and that footage to the contrary is in fact that of kidnapped Iraqi civilians.
- Five U.S. tanks and numerous vehicles have been destroyed by Iraqi fighters, and coalition forces enter but are later repelled from Umm Qasr.
- The Iraqi regime puts a bounty of 50 million dinars (US$33,000) for the capture, or 25 million dinars for the killing of each "mercenary".
- The British enter parts of the city of Basra.
- A hand grenade attack on a rear base of the 101st Airborne Division in Kuwait causes the death of CPT Chris Seifert of the Army and Maj Gregory Stone of the Air Force and injuries to 14 others. An American soldier, SGT Hasan Akbar is arrested for the attack.

== March 23 ==
- American and British forces succeed in taking the airport outside of Basra, and battle with Iraqi forces for control of the city itself.
- U.S. Marines battle Iraqi forces near the city of Nassiriya, a key crossing of the Euphrates about 225 miles (362 km) southeast of Baghdad.
- News media report that pictures of British and American soldiers wounded and killed by Iraqi forces were shown by the Arabian Al Jazeera TV network.
  - Sixteen Americans go missing; five of them were shown on Iraqi state-run television as prisoners of war and at least four are shown dead in what appears to be a hospital room.
- In another incident about ten U.S. Marines are confirmed to be killed, after they ran into an ambush during the Battle of Nasiriyah.
- The British television network ITV reports that its reporter Terry Lloyd was killed near Basra.
- The battles around the Iraqi cities of Basra and Nassiriya continue.
- Iraq reports that it has captured a number of American prisoners of war. The United States military states that 12 soldiers from a maintenance unit are missing. A videotape of the captured and dead soldiers are released, showing possible torture and execution-style killings. U.S. officials charge that Iraqi treatment of the captives violates the Geneva Conventions.
- A RAF Panavia Tornado is shot down by "friendly fire" by an American Patriot missile battery.
- Coalition forces take control of a large complex of buildings in An Najaf Province near the city of Najaf. Some news sources proclaim that this is a "huge chemical weapons plant", but Pentagon officials call such announcements "premature" and state that no weapons of mass destruction had yet been found.
- In Belgium, legal complaints are filed against American officials for "crimes against humanity". It was reported that an Iraqi representing seven families deposited complaints for violation of human rights against former U.S. President George H. W. Bush, Dick Cheney, Norman Schwarzkopf in Belgium. Supported by a socialist deputy and a non-governmental organization (NGO), the Iraqis denounce the bombing of a shelter which had made 403 civilian victims in Baghdad in February 1991 during the Persian Gulf War. This is made possible by the Belgian law of universal competence, which provides justice on war crimes, crimes against humanity and genocide, and can apply to any nationalities. U.S. Secretary of State Colin Powell indicates the event was a "serious problem", affecting the ability to go to Belgium, in particular to NATO in Brussels. Powell stated that this law was a subject of worry.

== March 24 ==
- An operation of about thirty American attack helicopters attack the Medina Division of the Iraqi Republican Guard, entrenched in the Karbala area. One U.S. Army Apache helicopter is shot down and captured by Iraqi civilians, along with its two crewmen, who appear later on Arab satellite TV channels. A CNN reporter that was embedded with a helicopter unit that participated in the battle reports the destruction of another helicopter and that helicopters were under heavy fire, with only two of them managing to achieve their objectives. The helicopter's crewmen are later safely recovered.
- China gives the United States the address of its embassy in Baghdad in hopes of avoiding a repeat of the deadly attack on the Chinese embassy in Belgrade.
- Five people, including one woman, are killed when a missile falls down onto their houses in a populated district in the west of Baghdad.
- The United States accuses the Russians of deliveries of weapons to Iraq. Ari Fleischer, the spokesman of the U.S. president, rejects denials by Moscow and claims that Washington has "evidence" of these deliveries, which could give the Iraqis invaluable assets against British and American forces. Devices listed are binoculars for night vision, GPS units, and anti-tank missiles. Fleischer says the U.S. government asked the Russians to immediately put an end to its assistance. The Russian government and the companies mentioned as having delivered armaments to Iraq rejects these allegations on Monday, describing them as "inventions" and reaffirming that Moscow strictly respects the embargo imposed by the U.N. on Baghdad. Russian President Vladimir Putin rejects the American charges himself during a telephone conversation with George W. Bush, the U.S. presidential press secretary indicated Tuesday, quoted by the Interfax agency.
- The Arab League votes 21–1 in favor of a resolution demanding the immediate and unconditional removal of U.S. and British soldiers from Iraq. The lone dissenting vote was cast by Kuwait.
- Iraqi leader Saddam Hussein gives a televised address on Iraqi state television, urging Iraqi citizens to fight coalition forces:

Oh, brave fighters! Hit your enemy with all your strength. Oh Iraqis, fight with the strength of the spirit of jihad which you carry in you and push them to the point where they cannot go on.

== March 25 ==
- Coalition forces begin fighting Iraqi militia in Basra, the second largest city in Iraq. British soldiers reported that the Shiite population of Basra appeared to be rebelling against the Iraqi militia. The anti-Saddam resistance group based in Iran, the Supreme Council of the Islamic Revolution in Iraq, confirmed that the Shiite revolt was taking place in Basra. According to some sources, the Iraqi militia forces were attacking the local Basra civilians, attempting to stop the revolt, with artillery and mortars. The Iraqi Information Minister Muhammed al-Sahhaf denied that any uprising was taking place in Basra.
- The Red Cross warned that a humanitarian crisis was emerging in the city. The Red Cross, Save the Children and other organizations are attempting to reach the city. Kuwait also has a caravan of supply trucks heading north into Iraq. Coalition forces announce that the port city of Umm Qasr was now "safe and open" and divers begin searching for mines off shore. Once the waters are clear, British ships, which are waiting off of the Iraqi coast, land in Umm Qasr with additional medicine, food and water for the area. Coalition forces have a small supply of food and water that they begin to pass out to the citizens of Umm Qasr.
- While fighting in Nasiriya, coalition forces discover and confiscate weapons caches and gear to protect against chemical weapons, including a T-55 tank, over 3,000 chemical suits with masks, and Iraqi munitions and military uniforms. All of this equipment was hidden in a Nasiriya hospital.
- U.S. forces advance toward Baghdad, but are hampered by extreme dust storms.
- Thousands of chemical suits as well as a tank and a large stockpile of weapons are reportedly found by coalition forces in the An Nasiriyah hospital in Iraq. Coalition forces enter the hospital after being fired upon by Iraqi soldiers hiding in the building. U.S. officials report the possibility that chemical weapons would be deployed on coalition troops as they approach Baghdad.
- British forces report that a popular uprising in the city of Basra has provoked Iraqi troops to fire upon civilians with mortars. British forces attack the mortar position.
- According to a U.S. officer, approximately 650 Iraqis were killed around Najaf "in the last twenty-four hours" while the American forces would not have, on their side, recorded any casualties. This assessment, not confirmed by any independent source, would be the heaviest since the beginning of the offensive, the Thursday prior.

== March 26 ==
- The American central command in Qatar admits to have carried out bombardments which could have killed civilians because Iraqi military assets were being placed close to civilian areas - within 300 feet (100 m) in some cases. This occurs a few hours after two explosions occurred in on a commercial street of Baghdad which killed 14 Iraqi civilians and injured thirty more, according to Iraqi civil defense. Also on this day special units of the Iraqi Republican Guard, for the first time, take part in the fights against the American and British forces. Just after the marketplace explosions in Baghdad, Russia calls for "the immediate end of the war against Iraq" and discussions to resume within the Security Council.
- 954 soldiers from the American 173rd Airborne Brigade, commanded by Colonel William C. Mayville, conduct a combat parajump into Northern Iraq onto Bashur Airfield. Their mission is to secure a northern front to air-land ground units including armor and logistical assets. The paratroopers also assist special operations forces (SOF) already active in the areas north of Kirkuk and Mosul.

== March 27 ==
- U.S. forces take the bridge at Samawah.

== March 28 ==
- The U.N. Security Council unanimously adopts a resolution allowing the resumption of the Oil for Food program, suspended on March 18, and which 60% of the Iraqi population relies upon for sustenance. The Secretary General of the United Nations, Kofi Annan, underlines that this vote should not be confused with a recognition of the war carried out and with a way to legitimize the military action afterwards. The resolution states that the chief responsibility for addressing humanitarian consequences of the war would fall to the United States and the United Kingdom if they take control of the country. This refers to the Fourth Geneva Convention of 1949, which defines the responsibilities of a country in wartime to occupying forces.
- U.S. Secretary of Defense Donald Rumsfeld accuses Syria of supplying arms and materiel to Iraq; Syria denies these allegations.
- The first coalition forces humanitarian aid ship, the RFA Sir Galahad, prepares to dock at the Iraqi port of Umm Qasr at 11:45 p.m. (UTC).
- After 2 days of fighting, Royal Marines from J Company, 42 Commando, captured the town of Umm Khayyal, killing a number of Fedayeen Saddam fighters.
- An Iraqi missile strikes a shopping mall in Kuwait City. The mall was closed at the time it was hit.

== March 29 ==
- The Iraqi Information Minister Mohammed Saeed al-Sahaf accuses U.S. forces of killing 140 civilians during the last 24 hours and denies allegations that Iraqi soldiers are disguising themselves as civilians.
- An explosion damaged a shopping center in Kuwait City before dawn. Initial reports suggest the cause is a malfunctioning U.S. cruise missile, but later reports focused on an Iraqi Silkworm missile as being responsible. No injuries are reported.
- An Iraqi suicide bomber, driving a taxi, kills four U.S. soldiers, Sgt Eugene Williams, Cpl Michael "Jersey" Curtain, PFC Michael Creighton, and PFC Diego Rincon.

== March 31 ==
- U.S. forces kill seven civilians, including women and children, in an automobile whose driver allegedly did not slow down at a checkpoint. According to a U.S. official, the family, which was probably trying to flee, did not stop after U.S. forces fired several shots above the car, and then into the car's radiator.
- Journalist Peter Arnett is fired by NBC after giving an interview to Iraqi television, which some considered as unfairly critical of the Bush administration's war on Iraq. Later in the day, Arnett was hired by a British tabloid, the Daily Mirror.
- The U.S. Department of Defense orders Fox News embedded reporter Geraldo Rivera away from its troops and demands him to leave Iraq after accusing him of reporting the positions of U.S. forces.

== April 2 ==
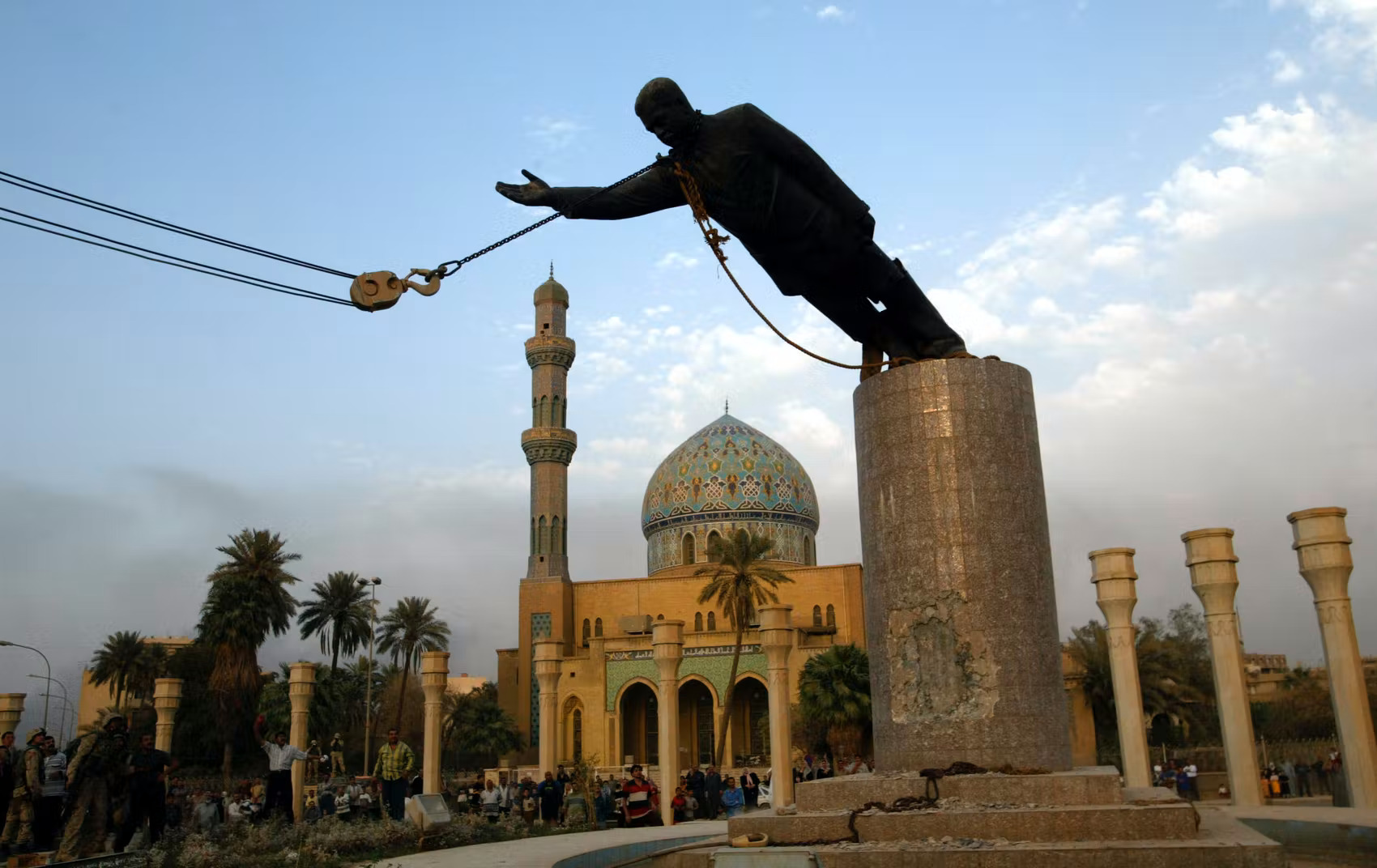
U.S. Marines and Iraqi civilians pull down a statue of Saddam Hussein in April 2003.

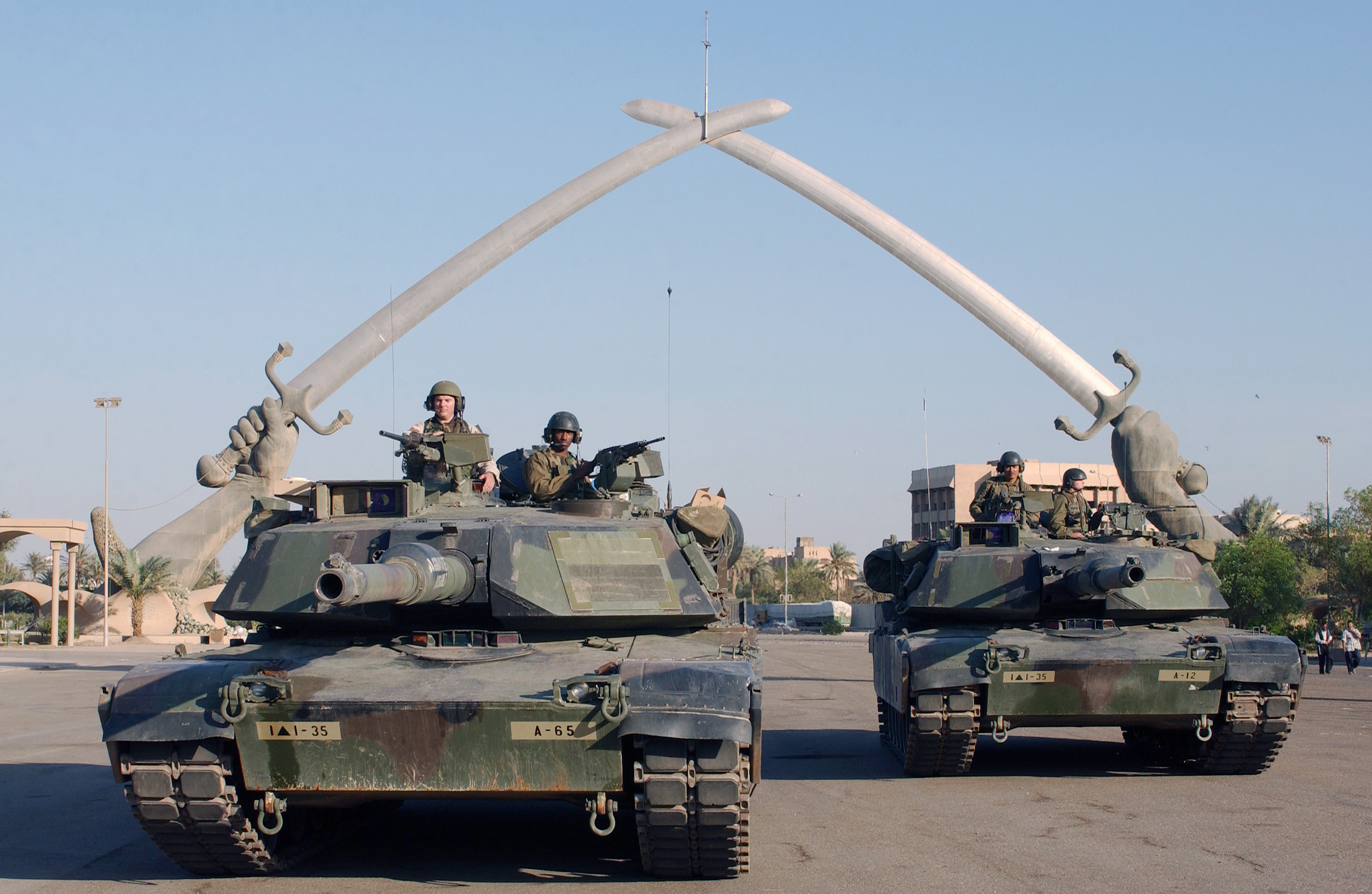
U.S. Army M1A1 Abrams pose for a photo under the Victory Arch at Baghdad's Ceremony Square in 2003.

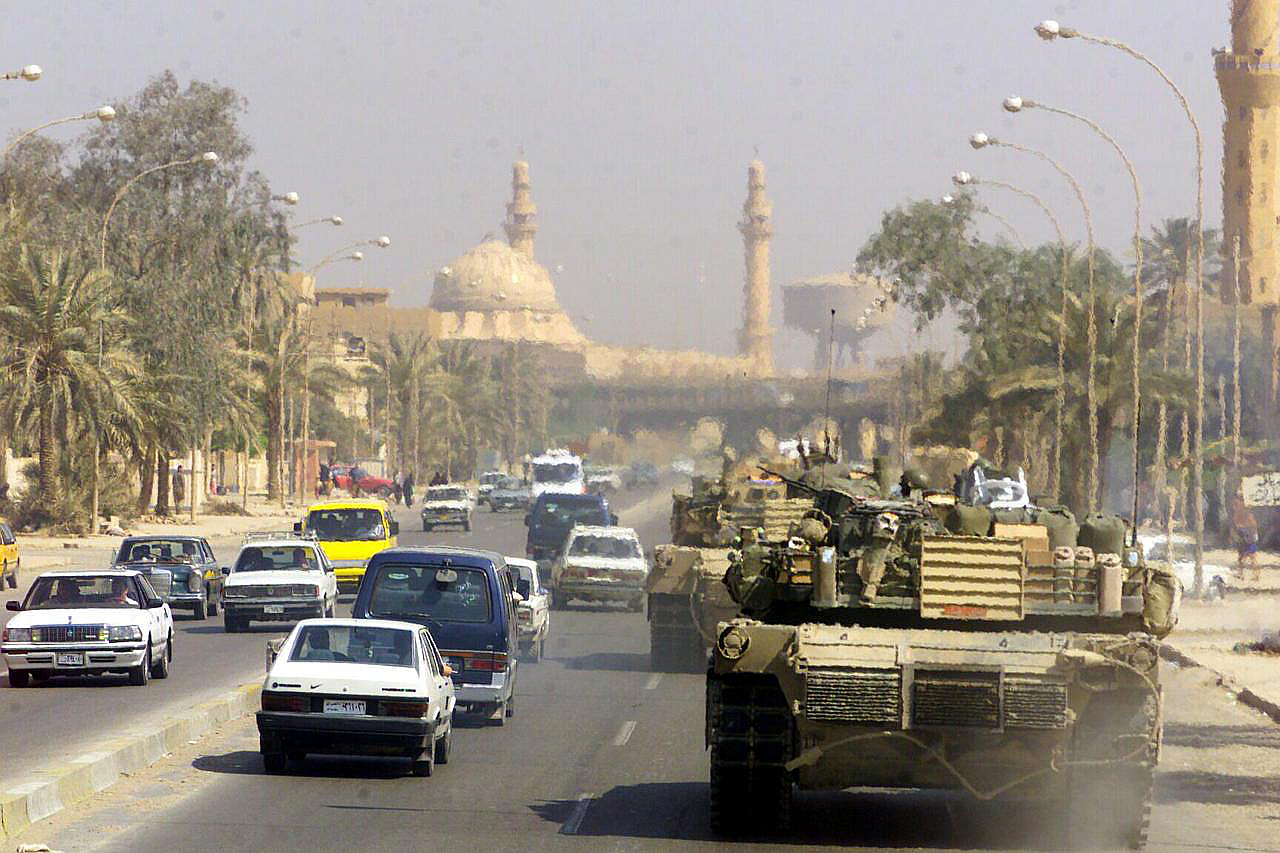
A U.S. Marine M1 Abrams tank of the U.S. 1st Marine Division patrols a Baghdad street after its capture in 2003 during Operation Iraqi Freedom.

- U.S. forces reach the outskirts of Baghdad and encounter fierce fighting from small units of Iraqi Republican Guard.
- Kurdish militiamen, aided by U.S. forces, move into Kanilan near Mosul in northern Iraq. Citizens living in the town tell reporters that they are happy that the Iraqi soldiers are gone.

== April 3 ==
- U.S. forces take control of Saddam International Airport, in southern Baghdad. They rename the airport to "Baghdad International Airport".

== April 4 ==
- MSNBC finds evidence of the deadly toxins ricin, and botulinum at a laboratory in northern Iraq, used as a training camp for Ansar al-Islam, a terrorist group with ties to the al-Qaida terrorist network. The tests conducted by MSNBC were the same type of tests used by U.N. weapons inspectors. U.S. officials said that they planned on conducting their own tests of the area.
- Saddam Hussein appears on Iraqi TV for the final time as the country's head of state.
- U.S. forces search the Latifiyah Explosives and Ammunition Plant, south of Baghdad, and discover thousands of boxes full of vials of a white powdery substance, atropine (a nerve agent antidote) and Arabic documents on how to engage in chemical warfare. Early reports suggest that the powdery substance is an explosive, although additional tests are needed. Some vials contained a liquid. The facility had been identified by the International Atomic Energy Agency as a suspected chemical, biological and nuclear weapons site. U.N. weapons inspectors visited the plant at least nine times, including as recently as February 18. Later tests show no forbidden weaponry.

== April 6 ==
- Basra becomes the first major Iraqi city to be captured by coalition forces when it comes under British control.

== April 8 ==
- The International Atomic Energy Agency's chief, Mohamed ElBaradei, reiterates a statement he made on March 31 that only the IAEA has a mandate to search for and destroy any nuclear weapons or parts of nuclear weapons that are found in Iraq.
- Two American air to surface missiles hit Al Jazeera's office in Baghdad, killing a reporter and wounding a cameraman. The nearby office of Arab satellite TV channel Abu Dhabi is also hit by air strikes. Al-Jazeera accuses the U.S. of attacking civilian media as censorship. On the same day, an American M1 Abrams main battle tank fires into the fifteenth floor of Baghdad's Palestine Hotel, where many foreign journalists are berthed, killing two cameramen and wounding three. In the case of Abu Dhabi, the station airs footage of Iraqi fire coming from underneath the camera's viewpoint. In the hotel's case, however, other journalists on the scene deny any fire from or around the hotel.

== April 9 ==
- Baghdad is captured by U.S. forces. Iraqis cheer in the streets as U.S. forces capture deserted Ba'ath Party ministry buildings and pull down a huge iron statue of Saddam Hussein, ending his 24-year rule of Iraq. Looting of government offices breaks out and forces fighting for Hussein melt away in large portions of the city.

== April 10 ==
- Mosul and Kirkuk captured by American and Kurdish forces.

== April 11 ==
- Looting and unrest, especially in major cities such as Baghdad and Basra becomes a very serious issue. In Baghdad, with the notable exception of the Oil Ministry, which was guarded by American soldiers, the majority of government and public buildings are totally plundered, to the point where there is nothing of any value left. This includes the National Museum of Iraq, with initial reports stating that 170,000 artifacts have been lost. The reports are later discovered to have been exaggerated, with the actual losses ultimately being determined to have been around 15,000 items. Many major hospitals are also looted. The losses caused by looting and plundering starts to cause more and more damage to Iraqi civilian infrastructure, economy, and culture, than those caused by three weeks of coalition bombing.

== April 13 ==
- Tikrit, the home town of Saddam Hussein, and the last town not under control of the coalition, was taken by the Marines of Task Force Tripoli. Perhaps to the surprise of many, there was little resistance.

== April 15 ==
- With the capture of the Tikrit region, the coalition declares that the war in Iraq is effectively over.

== May 1 ==
- U.S. President George W. Bush announces from the flight deck of the aircraft carrier USS Abraham Lincoln, that major combat operations by the U.S. in Iraq "have ended".

== See also ==
- Iraq disarmament timeline 1990–2003
- Preparations for the 2003 invasion of Iraq
- Timeline of the Iraq War
