= Nashwa =

Nashwa is a feminine given name of Arabic origin. Notable people and places with this name include:

== People ==
- Nashwa Eassa (born 1980), Sudanese particle physicist
- Nashwa Mustafa (born 1968), Egyptian actress
- Nashwa Al-Ruwaini (born 1972), Egyptian media personality

== Places ==
- Al Nashwa, Iraq, a village in Basrah Governorate
- Al-Nashwa, a district of Al-Hasakah, Syria

== Other ==
- Nashwa (horse), Thoroughbred racehorse foaled in 2019

== See also ==
- Nashwan (disambiguation), for the masculine version of this given name
