= Iraq disarmament timeline 1990–2003 =

Iraq disarmament timeline 1990–2003 lists the notable developments in the reduction in the military capabilities and categories of armaments of the regime of Saddam Hussein prior to the American Invasion of the country in 2003.

== 1990 ==
24 July 1990

- Nine days before Iraq's invasion of Kuwait, US State Department spokeswoman, Margaret Tutwiler states: "We do not have any defence treaties with Kuwait, and there are no special defence or security commitments to Kuwait."

2 August 1990

- The Gulf War begins when Iraqi troops invaded Kuwait with armor and infantry, occupying strategic posts throughout the country, including the Emir's palace.
- The UN Security Council passes Resolution 660, condemning Iraq's invasion and demanding a immediate and unconditional withdrawal of Iraqi troops.

6 August 1990

- The UN Security Council passes Resolution 661, placing economic sanctions on Iraq.

8 August 1990

- Iraq appoints puppet regime in Kuwait which declares a merger with Iraq.

29 November 1990

- The UN Security Council passes Resolution 678, giving Iraq a withdrawal deadline of 15 January 1991, and authorizing member states "all necessary means to uphold and implement Resolution 660" if Iraq failed to withdraw by that deadline.

== 1991 ==
12 January 1991

- The United States Congress passed a joint resolution to authorizing the use of military force to drive Iraq out of Kuwait.

17 January 1991

- A day after a deadline was passed set in Resolution 678, Coalition forces launch Operation Desert Storm with a massive air campaign against targets in Iraq and Kuwait.

22 February 1991

- Iraq agrees to a Soviet-proposed cease-fire agreement. The US rejected the proposal but said that retreating Iraqi forces would not be attacked, and gave twenty-four hours for Iraq to begin withdrawing forces from Kuwait.

24 February 1991

- The US-led ground campaign begins for the Liberation of Kuwait.

26 February 1991

- Iraqi troops begin to retreat out of Kuwait, setting fire to Kuwaiti oil fields as part of a scorched earth policy.

28 February 1991

- One hundred hours after the ground campaign started, US President George H. W. Bush declared a ceasefire. Kuwait has been fully liberated.

3 March 1991

- Iraq accepts the terms of a ceasefire.

Mid March – Early April 1991

- Iraqi military forces suppress Kurdish and Shiites Muslim rebellions in the southern and northern parts of the country during the 1991 uprising in Iraq, creating a humanitarian disaster on the borders of Turkey and Iran.

3 April 1991

- The U.N. Security Council passes a ceasefire agreement, Resolution 687. The resolution also called for the destruction, or removal of all chemical and biological weapons, all stocks of agents and components, all research, development, support and manufacturing facilities for ballistic missiles with a range greater than 150 km and related repair and production facilities, recognize Kuwait, account for missing Kuwaitis, return Kuwaiti property and end its support for international terrorism. This resolution created a special commission, UNSCOM, to inspect Iraq's chemical, biological and nuclear facilities. Iraq was required to turn over all biological and chemical weapons to UNSCOM for destruction, and ordered to respect the 1968 Non-Proliferation of Nuclear Weapons Treaty.

4 April 1991

- According to UNSCOM, Iraqi nuclear scientists are ordered to hide nuclear weapons from UN inspectors, collect and hide computer data, and formulate a "legal" justification for the existence of Iraqi nuclear labs.

5 April 1991

- The UN Security Council passes Resolution 688, condemning Iraq's repressive measures exercised against civilians. The council also demands access for humanitarian groups.

6 April 1991

- Iraq accepts Resolution 687.

8 April 1991

- At a European Union meeting in Luxembourg, a UN safe-haven and a no-fly zone, code-named Operation Provide Comfort, in northern Iraq was established north of the latitude 36 degrees north, for the protection of Kurds.
- The US orders Iraq to end all military action in the northern Kurdish area.

18 April 1991

- Iraq declares some of its chemical weapons and materials to the UN, as required by Resolution 687, and claims that it does not have biological weapons program

19 April 1991

- Swedish diplomat Rolf Ekéus is appointed as the Executive Chairman of UNSCOM.

15–21 May 1991

- First on-site inspections under UNSCR 687 in Iraq conducted by the International Atomic Energy Agency

9 June 1991

- UNSCOM begins its first inspections in Iraq

17 June 1991

- The Security Council affirms in Resolution 699 that Iraq was responsible for the costs of the inspections, and Resolution 700 fully implementing the arms embargo against Iraq

23–28 June 1991

- UNSCOM/IAEA teams attempt to intercept Iraqi vehicles carrying nuclear related equipment called calutrons. Iraqi soldiers fire warning shots in the air to prevent inspectors from approaching the vehicles.

Summer, 1991

- Rolf Ekéus, Executive Chairman of UNSCOM, arranges for a loan to UNSCOM of a US Lockheed U-2 spy plane for taking surveillance photos of Iraq.

2 August 1991

- UNSCOM's biological inspection team is told by Iraq that any research into biological weapons was "for defensive military purposes."

15 August 1991

- The UN Security Council proposes Resolution 706, a "food for oil" resolution, allowing Iraq to export up to $1.6bn of oil, the revenue from which would be paid into a UN-administered account. This money would then only be used to buy food, medicines and other essential material for Iraqis over a six-month period. Some of this money would also be used to meet compensation payments to Kuwait and the cost of UN operations.
- The UN Security Council passes Resolution 707, emphasising the need for Iraq to allow UNSCOM and the International Atomic Energy Agency (IAEA) immediate and unconditional access to any areas they wish to inspect. Iraq was also ordered not to move or hide anything relating to its nuclear, chemical or biological programs.

September 1991

- Former US Marine intelligence officer Scott Ritter is hired as a UNSCOM inspector

21–30 September 1991

- Combined UNSCOM/IAEA team co-led by Robert Gallucci and David Kay discover files exposing Iraq's hidden nuclear weapons program. Iraqi officials confiscate documents and return most hours later. Inspection of Iraq's nuclear weapons program headquarters the next day yields additional documents that inspectors refuse to relinquish. In response, Iraq refuses to allow the inspection team to leave the site without turning over the documents. A four-day standoff ensues, but Iraq permits the team to leave with the documents after a statement from the UN Security Council threatens enforcement actions.

11 October 1991

- The UN Security Council passes Resolution 715, which approves joint UNSCOM and IAEA plans for ongoing monitoring and verification. The resolution demands that Iraq "accept unconditionally the inspectors and all other personnel designated by the Special Commission"
- Iraq says that it considers the Monitoring and Verification Plans adopted by Resolution 715 to be unlawful, and states that it is not ready to comply with the Resolution.

== 1992 ==
18 February 1992

- The Executive Chairman of UNSCOM details Iraq's refusal to abide by UN Security Council disarmament resolutions.

19 March 1992

- Iraq declares the existence of 89 ballistic missiles and chemical weapons. Iraq also claims that it unilaterally destroyed most of these materials the previous summer, in violation of resolution 687.

April 1992

- Iraq calls for a halt to UNSCOM's aerial surveillance flights. The UN Security Council reaffirms UNSCOM's right to conduct such flights

May–June 1992

- Iraq discloses some of its prohibited weapons programs.

July 1992

- UNSCOM begins to destroy large quantities of Iraq's chemical weapons and production facilities

6–29 July 1992

- Iraq refuses an inspection team access to the Iraqi Ministry of Agriculture. UNSCOM claimed that it had reliable information that the site contained archives related to illegal weapons activities. UN Inspectors stage a 17-day "sit-in" outside of the building. UN inspectors eventually leave when their safety is threatened, and the UN Security Council seems unwilling to support their efforts to enter the building with a threat of force.

26 August 1992

- A No-Fly Zone, which prohibits the flights of Iraqi aircraft, was established in southern Iraq, south of latitude 32 degrees north to protect the Shiite's population, codename Operation Southern Watch.

== 1993 ==
January 1993

- Iraq refuses to allow UNSCOM to use its own aircraft to fly into Iraq. Iraq also starts military incursions into the demilitarized zone between Iraq and Kuwait and increases its military activity in the northern and southern No-Fly Zones.

19 January 1993

- US President George H. W. Bush, on his final day in office, orders a Tomahawk cruise missiles attack of the Zaafaraniya Nuclear Fabrication and Industrial Complex in the Baghdad suburbs, linking the factory to nuclear weapons manufacturing capability. A stray missile hits the Al-Rashid Hotel in Baghdad.
- Iraq agrees to allow UNSCOM to use their own aircraft to fly into Iraq.

13 April 1993

- The Kuwaiti government claims to uncover an Iraqi assassination plot against former US President George H. W. Bush shortly after his ceremonial visit to Kuwait. Two Iraqi nationals, caught with smuggled hashish and alcohol inside Kuwait, confess to driving a car-bomb into Kuwait on behalf of the Iraqi Intelligence Service.

18 June 1993

- Iraq refuses to allow UNSCOM weapons inspectors to install remote-controlled monitoring cameras at two missile engine test stands.

26 June 1993

- US President Bill Clinton warns Iraq over its standoff with UNSCOM inspectors.

27 June 1993

- US President Bill Clinton orders a cruise missile attack on Iraqi intelligence headquarters in the Al-Mansur district, Baghdad, in retaliation for an attempted assassination by Iraqi agents on former US President George H. W. Bush in Kuwait in mid-April. The cruise missiles were launched from the USS Peterson (DD-696) and USS Chancellorsville (CG-62) (Missiles were launched late on the evening of 26 June).

5 July 1993

- UN inspection teams leave Iraq. Iraq then agrees to UNSCOM demands and the inspection teams return.

26 November 1993

- Iraq accepts UN Resolution 715 and the plans for ongoing monitoring and verification.

== 1994 ==
June 1994

- UN weapons inspectors Ritter and Smidovitch learn, through Israeli intelligence reports, that Qusay Hussein, Saddam's son, is the key player in hiding Iraq's illegal weapons.
- UNSCOM completes destruction of large quantities of chemical warfare agents and production equipment

September–October 1994

- Iraq threatens to stop cooperating with UNSCOM inspectors and begins once again deploying troops near the Kuwait border. In response, the US begins to deploy troops to Kuwait. Code-named Operation Vigilant Warrior, 1st Brigade of the Fort Stewart, Georgia based 24th Infantry Division (Mechanized) deployed and drew pre-positioned equipment in Kuwait.

8 October 1994

- President of the UN Security Council says that Iraq's demands are unacceptable and that the country must withdraw its troops from the Kuwait border.

15 October 1994

- Iraq withdraws troops from its border with Kuwait.
- The UN Security Council passes Resolution 949, demanding that Iraq "cooperate fully" with UNSCOM and immediately withdraw forces recently deployed to southern Iraq, not use any forces in a hostile or threatening manner against either neighbouring countries or UN staff operating in Iraq, nor redeploy or enhance its military forces in the southern part of the country. Iraq withdraws its troops and once again begins to work with UNSCOM inspectors.

10 November 1994

- The Iraqi National Assembly recognizes Kuwait's borders and its independence.

== 1995 ==
March 1995

- Iraq makes more disclosures about its prohibited biological and chemical weapons programs.

14 April 1995

- The UN Security Council passes its previously proposed "Oil for Food" program. This became Resolution 986. Saddam Hussein accepted the terms of the program.

Summer, 1995

- According to UNSCOM, the unity of the UN Security Council begins to fray, as a few countries, particularly France and Russia, are starting to become increasingly interested in the financial opportunities of a post-sanctions Iraq.

1 July 1995

- In response to UNSCOM's evidence, Iraq admits for first time the existence of an offensive biological weapons program, but denies weaponization.

July 1995

- Iraq threatens to end all cooperation with UNSCOM and IAEA, if sanctions are not lifted by 31 August 1995.

August 1995

- Following the defection of his son-in-law, Hussein Kamel al-Majid, minister of industry and military industrialisation, Saddam Hussein makes new revelations about the full extent of his biological and nuclear arms programs. Iraq also withdraws its last UN declaration of prohibited biological weapons and turns over a large amount of new documents on its WMD programs.
- Israeli intelligence reports that Iraq has been attempting to purchase missile gyroscopes (guidance devices) from a Russian export company.

November 1995

- Iraq provides more information on its prohibited missile programs

10 November 1995

- With help from Israel and Jordan, UN inspector Ritter intercepts 240 Russian gyroscopes and accelerometers on their way to Iraq from Russia.

16 December 1995

- Iraqi scuba divers, under the direction of UNSCOM, dredge the Tigris River near Baghdad. The divers find over 200 additional Russian made missile instruments and components.

== 1996 ==
February 1996

- UNSCOM begins using eavesdropping devices in Iraq. The information is delivered to analysis centers in Britain, Israel, and the US.
- Recently defected Iraqi weapons scientist and son-in-law to Saddam Hussein, Hussein Kamel al-Majid, returns to Iraq. Within days of his return, he is murdered along with his brother, father, sister and her children.

March 1996

- Iraqi forces refuse UNSCOM inspection teams access to five sites designated for inspection. The teams enter the sites only after delays of up to 17 hours.

19 March 1996

- The UN Security Council issues a statement expressing its concern over Iraq's obstructive behavior, which it terms "a clear violation of Iraq's obligations under relevant resolutions." The Security council also demands that Iraq allow UNSCOM teams immediate, unconditional and unrestricted access to all sites designated for inspection.

27 March 1996

- The UN Security Council passes Resolution 1051, recognizing the need for Iraqi imports and exports to be monitored by UNSCOM and the IAEA. The resolution also called for countries exporting so called "dual-use items" which could potentially be used in weapons systems to notify UNSCOM. The resolution also demands that Iraq meet unconditionally all its obligations under the inspections mechanism and cooperate fully with the Special Commission and the director-general of the IAEA

May–June 1996

- UNSCOM supervises the destruction of Al-Hakam, Iraq's main production facility of biological warfare agents

June 1996

- Iraq once again refuses UNSCOM inspection teams access to a number of sites under investigation
- The US fails in its attempt to build support for military action in the UN Security Council.
- Iraq provides more information on its prohibited biological weapons and missile programs.

12 June 1996

- The UN Security Council passes Resolution 1060, which calls Iraq's actions a clear violation of the council's earlier resolutions. The resolution also demands that Iraq grant "immediate and unrestricted access" to all sites designated for inspection by UNSCOM

13 June 1996

- Iraq once again refuses UN inspection teams access to sites under investigation.

19–22 June 1996

- Rolf Ekéus negotiates with Iraq, gaining access for UNSCOM to inspect "sensitive" sites. The deal was made, according to UNSCOM, on Iraqi's terms. Only four UN inspectors are allowed into each of these sites at one time.

July 1996

- UN Inspector Ritter attempts to conduct surprise inspections on the Republican Guard facility at the airport, but is blocked by Iraqi officials. By the time UNSCOM inspectors are allowed into the facility a few days later, they find nothing.

Summer, 1996

- Members of the UN Security Council express unease with some of UNSCOM's confrontational tactics

31 August 1996

- Iraqi forces launch an offensive into the northern No-Fly Zone and capture Erbil during the Iraqi Kurdish Civil War.

3 September 1996

- The US launched Operation Desert Strike with a series of cruise missile attacks on Iraqi targets in Kut, Iskandariyah, Nasiriyah, and Tallil in response to Iraqi troops moving to the northern part of Iraq. In response for Iraqi troops moving to the north, the US extends the southern No-Fly Zone to latitude 33 degrees north.

November 1996

- UNSCOM inspectors uncover buried illegal missile parts. Iraq refuses to allow UNSCOM teams to remove remnants of missile engines for analysis outside of the country.

30 December 1996

- The UN Security Council states that it deplores Iraq's intransigence on the buried missile parts.

== 1997 ==
1 January 1997

- A day after Operation Provide Comfort ended, Operation Northern Watch was launched by US, UK, and Turkey to continue in protecting the Kurds above the 36th parallel in the north from air attacks by Iraqi forces.

February 1997

- Iraq allows UNSCOM to remove the missile parts found last 26 September

March 1997

- US Secretary of State Madeleine Albright gives a speech at Georgetown University in which she argues that sanctions on Iraq probably will not end until Saddam Hussein is replaced. Albright is criticized by some as undercutting UNSCOM's ability to gain Iraqi cooperation.

June 1997

- Iraqi military escorts on board a UNSCOM helicopter try to physically prevent the UNSCOM pilot from flying the helicopter in the direction of its planned destination, threatening the safety of the aircraft and their crews.

18 June 1997

- The UN Security Council expresses concerns over Iraq's threatening actions against UNSCOM helicopters and crews.

21 June 1997

- Iraq once again refuses UN inspection teams access to sites under investigation.
- The UN Security Council passes Resolution 1115, which condemns Iraq's actions and demands that the country allow UNSCOM's team immediate, unconditional and unrestricted access to any sites for inspection and officials for interviews.

July 1997

- Australian diplomat Richard Butler succeeds Rolf Ekéus as Executive Chairman of UNSCOM

September 1997

- Iraq provides more information on its prohibited biological weapons programs.

13 September 1997

- An Iraqi military officer attacks a UNSCOM weapons inspector on board a UNSCOM helicopter while the inspector was attempting to take photographs of unauthorized movement of Iraqi vehicles inside a site designated for inspection.

17 September 1997

- While waiting for access to a site, UNSCOM inspectors witness and videotape Iraqi guards moving files, burning documents, and dumping waste cans into a nearby river.

25 September 1997

- UNSCOM inspects an Iraqi "food laboratory". One of the inspectors, Dr. Diane Seaman, enters the building through the back door and catches several men running out with suitcases. The suitcases contained log books for the creation of illegal bacteria and chemicals. The letterhead comes from the president's office and from the Special Security Office (SSO).
- UNSCOM attempts to inspect the SSO headquarters but is blocked.

23 October 1997

- The UN Security Council passes Resolution 1134 demanding once again that Iraq cooperate with UNSCOM inspectors.

October 1997

- UNSCOM destroys large quantities of illegal chemical weapons and related equipment. Iraq admitted that some of this equipment had been used to produce VX gas in May 1997.

29 October 1997

- Iraq demands that US citizens working inside UNSCOM inspections teams leave the country immediately. Iraq also says it will shoot down U2 surveillance planes.

2 November 1997

- Iraq prevents three American weapons experts from entering the country.

12 November 1997

- The UN Security Council passes Resolution 1137, condemning Iraq's continued violations of earlier resolutions, and again demanded that Baghdad comply with the UNSCOM inspection teams.

13 November 1997

- UNSCOM withdraws all weapons inspectors because of the order to expel all American arms experts.

18 November 1997

- Russian President Boris Yeltsin meets with Iraqi officials. War is averted.

20 November 1997

- Saddam Hussein agrees to allow UN weapons inspectors to return to Iraq.

24 November 1997

- UNSCOM declares that it wishes to inspect Iraqi Presidential Palaces, but Iraq refuses.

12–16 December 1997

- Richard Butler meets with Tariq Aziz in Iraq, to discuss Iraq's refusal to allow inspections of "sensitive" sites. No agreement was reached.

22 December 1997

- The UN Security Council issues a statement calling on Iraq to cooperate fully with the commission and says that failure by Iraq to provide immediate, unconditional and unrestricted access to any site is an unacceptable and clear violation of Security Council resolutions.

== 1998 ==
January 1998

- Iraq wants Scott Ritter's team out and claims that Ritter is a spy.

15 January 1998

- US Ambassador to the UN, Bill Richardson tells Ritter to go back to Bahrain.

February 1998

- US President Bill Clinton remarks "(Hussein's) regime threatens the safety of his people, the stability of his region, and the security of all the rest of us. Some day, some way, I guarantee you, he'll use the arsenal. Let there be no doubt, we are prepared to act." Senate Democrats also passed Resolution 71, which urged President Clinton to "take all necessary and appropriate actions to respond to the threat posed by Iraq's refusal to end its weapons of mass destruction programs."

18 February 1998

- Albright, US Secretary of Defense William Cohen, and US National Security Advisor Sandy Berger visit Ohio State University for an internationally televised "town hall" meeting on a possible war with Iraq. Angry audience members and protestors disrupt the meeting.

20 February 1998

- Saddam Hussein negotiates a deal with UN Secretary-General Kofi Annan, allowing weapons inspectors to return to Baghdad, preventing military action by the US and Britain.

23 February 1998

- Iraq signs a "Memorandum of Understanding" with the UN, which says that the country will accept all relevant Security Council resolutions, cooperate fully with UNSCOM and the IAEA, and will grant UNSCOM and the IAEA immediate, unconditional and unrestricted access for their inspections.

2 March 1998

- US Secretary of State Madeleine Albright asks Richard Butler to keep Scott Ritter from heading any inspection team that is going to inspect Iraqi "sensitive" sites. After other leaders of UNSCOM inspection teams show support for Ritter in a memo to the Executive Chairman, Ritter returns to Iraq. The Security Council endorses the "Memorandum of Understanding" in Resolution 1154.

20–23 March 1998

- Richard Butler says that the agreement UN Secretary-General Kofi Annan made with the Iraqis has increased Iraqi cooperation with inspectors.

April 1998

- Scott Ritter complains to Richard Butler that the US, Israel, and the United Kingdom have stopped providing intelligence reports to him. US officials disagree, stating that only Ritter was cut off from information.

4 April 1998

- UNSCOM completes initial inspections of eight Iraqi Presidential Palace sites.

8 April 1998

- UNSCOM reports to the UN Security Council that Iraq's declaration on its biological weapons program is incomplete and inadequate.

15 May 1998

- An Iraqi delegation travels to Bucharest to meet with scientists who can provide missile guidance systems. UNSCOM learns of this event, but is never able to get this information to the UN Security Council.

Spring, 1998

- An UNSCOM inspection team discovers a dump full of destroyed Iraqi missiles. Analysis of the missile parts proves that Iraq had made a weapon containing VX.

July 1998

- UNSCOM discovers documents, at Iraqi Air Force headquarters, showing that Iraq overstated by at least 6,000 the number of chemical bombs it told the U.N. it had used during the Iran–Iraq War. These bombs remain unaccounted for.

3 August 1998

- Butler meets with Tariq Aziz who demands that weapons inspections must end immediately and that Iraq must be certified as free of weapons of mass destruction. Butler says he cannot do that.

5 August 1998

- Iraq suspends all cooperation with UNSCOM teams.

26 August 1998

- Scott Ritter resigns from UNSCOM, sharply criticized the Clinton administration and the U.N. Security Council for not being vigorous enough about insisting that Iraq's weapons of mass destruction be destroyed. Ritter also accused U.N. Secretary-General Kofi Annan of assisting Iraqi efforts at impeding UNSCOM's work. "Iraq is not disarming," Ritter said, and in a second statement, "Iraq retains the capability to launch a chemical strike."

9 September 1998

- The UN Security Council passes Resolution 1194 which once again condemns Iraq's lack of cooperation with inspectors.

29 September 1998

- The United States Congress passes the "Iraq Liberation Act", which states that the US wants to remove Saddam Hussein from office and replace the government with a democratic institution.

31 October 1998

- Iraq ends all forms of cooperation with the UNSCOM teams and expels inspectors from the country.
- U.S. President Clinton signed into law HR 4655, the Iraq Liberation Act of 1998.

5 November 1998

- The United Nations Security Council passes Resolution 1205 demanding Iraq rescind its decision to cease cooperation with UNSCOM and restrict the activities of the IAEA

13–14 November 1998

- US President Clinton orders airstrikes on Iraq in preparation of Operation Desert Thunder. Clinton then calls it off at the last minute when Iraq promises once again to unconditionally cooperate with UNSCOM

18 November 1998

- UNSCOM inspectors return to Iraq.

23–26 November 1998

- According to UNSCOM, Iraq ends cooperation with UNSCOM inspectors, alternately intimidating and withholding information from them.

30 November 1998

- Butler meets with US National Security Advisor Sandy Berger to coordinate timelines for a possible military strike against Iraq

11 December 1998

- Iraq announces that weapons inspections will no longer take place on Friday, the Muslim day of rest. Iraq also refuses to provide test data from the production of missiles and engines.

13 December 1998

- US President Clinton secretly approves an attack on Iraq.

15 December 1998

- Richard Butler reports to the UN Security Council that Iraq is still blocking inspections.

16–19 December 1998

- UNSCOM withdraws all weapons inspectors from Iraq.
- Saddam Hussein's failure to provide unfettered access to UN arms inspectors led Washington and London to hit 100 Iraqi targets in four days of bombing as part of Operation Desert Fox. The US government urged UNSCOM executive chairman Richard Butler to withdraw, and "[a] few hours before the attack began, 125 UN personnel were hurriedly evacuated from Baghdad to Bahrain, including inspectors from the UN Special Commission on Iraq and the International Atomic Energy Agency."

19 December 1998

- Iraqi vice-president Taha Yassin Ramadan announces that Iraq will no longer cooperate and declares that UNSCOM's "mission is over."

21 December 1998

- Three of five permanent members of the UN Security Council (Russia, France, and China) call for lifting of the eight-year oil embargo on Iraq, recasting or disbanding UNSCOM, and firing Butler. The US says it will veto any such measures.

== 1999 ==
4 January 1999

- Iraq requests that the UN replace its US and UK staff in Iraq.

17 December 1999

- The United Nations Monitoring, Verification and Inspection Commission (UNMOVIC) was created to replace UNSCOM. In Resolution 1284, Iraq was once again ordered to allow inspections teams immediate and unconditional access to any weapons sites and facilities. Iraq rejects the resolution.

== 2000 ==
2000

- It is reported that Saddam Hussein is using humanitarian funds to build presidential palaces and other personal endeavors.

1 March 2000

- Hans Blix assumes the position of Executive Chairman of UNMOVIC.

November 2000

- Iraq rejects new UN weapons inspections proposals.

== 2001 ==
February 2001

- British and US warplanes carry out bombing raids in an attempt to disable Iraq's air defense network.

1 July 2001

- A handwritten message with this date purports to show a link between Al Qaeda and Iraq's Saddam Hussein government. The letter, purportedly from the head of Iraqi Intelligence to Saddam outlines mission training which Mohammed Atta, one of the organizers of the 11 September attacks, has supposedly received in Iraq. It also claims that Hussein accepted a shipment from Niger, presumably of uranium.

11 September 2001

- In multiple terrorist attacks on the United States, al-Qaeda hijackers crash American Airlines Flight 11 and United Airlines Flight 175 into and destroy the Twin Towers of the World Trade Center in New York City, and crash American Airlines Flight 77 into the Pentagon in Washington, D.C. United Airlines Flight 93, also heading for Washington, D.C. to attack the White House or the United States Capitol, crashes into a field near Shanksville, Pennsylvania, after passengers and members of flight crew attempt to re-take control. A total of 2,996 people, the vast majority of them civilians, died in the attacks and more than 6,000 others injured.

== 2002 ==
=== January ===
29 January

- US President George W. Bush in 2002 State of the Union Address, calling Iraq a member of the axis of evil, and saying "The United States of America will not permit the world's most dangerous regimes to threaten us with the world's most destructive weapons."

=== February ===
- The CIA sent former Ambassador Joseph Wilson to investigate the yellowcake claims with officials from Niger. Wilson met with the current US Ambassador to Niger, Barbro Owens-Kirkpatrick at the embassy and then interviewed dozens of officials who had been in the Niger government at the time of the supposed deal. He ultimately concluded: "it was highly doubtful that any such transaction had ever taken place." Wilson learned that the Iraqis had in fact requested a meeting to discuss "expanding commercial relations" but that Niger's Prime Minister Mayaki had declined, due to concern about U.N. sanctions against Iraq. After President Bush's 2003 State of the Union Address included these 16 words: "The British government has learned that Saddam Hussein recently sought significant quantities of uranium from Africa", ambassador Wilson wrote a critical op-ed in The New York Times in which he explained the nature of the documents and the government's prior knowledge of their unreliability for use in a case for war. Wilson described the basis for his mission to Niger as follows: "The vice president's office asked a serious question [about the truth of allegations that Iraq was seeking to purchase uranium yellowcake from Niger]. I was asked to help formulate the answer." Shortly after Wilson's op-ed, the identity of Wilson's wife, undercover CIA analyst Valerie Plame, was revealed in a column by Robert Novak after a conversation with Richard Armitage, leading to an investigation as to whether the revelation was retribution for Wilson going public with doubts about the yellowcake claims. It is a felony to reveal the identity of a CIA agent, yet no one has been convicted as a result of Novak's column, though I. Lewis 'Scooter' Libby, Dick Cheney's Chief of Staff, was convicted of perjury in the Plame leak investigation.

=== March ===
18 March

- Jack Abramoff tells a friend, known as Octagon1, that Karl Rove said that there will be an "upcoming war on Iraq."

=== May ===
14 May

- The UN Security Council passes Resolution 1409, which reaffirms UN members' commitment to maintaining the territorial integrity of Iraq and approves a streamlined sanctions regime. It also lifts restrictions on the export of civilian goods and commodities to Iraq.

=== July ===
5 July

- Iraq once again rejects new UN weapons inspection proposals.

23 July

- A British government memo gives an overview of a secret meeting of United Kingdom Labour government, defense, and intelligence figures, who discuss the build-up to war in Iraq. The head of MI6, recently back from visiting Washington, is quoted as expressing the view that "Bush wanted to remove Saddam, through military action, justified by the conjunction of terrorism and WMD. But the intelligence and facts were being fixed around the policy."

=== August ===
- According to U.S. Intelligence, China, with help from France and Syria, has secretly sold to Iraq the prohibited chemical Hydroxyl-terminated polybutadiene, or HTPB, which is used in making solid fuel for long-range missiles. France denies that the sale took place. U.S. intelligence traces the sale back to China's Qilu Chemicals company in Shandong province. The chemical sale involved a French company known as CIS Paris, which helped broker the sale of 20 tons of HTPB, which was then shipped from China to the Syrian port of Tartus. The chemicals were then shipped by truck from Syria to an Iraqi missile manufacturing plant.

2 August

- In a letter to the UN Secretary-General, Iraq invites Hans Blix to Iraq for discussions on remaining disarmament issues.

17 August

- A letter from an Iraqi intelligence official urgently asks agents in Iraq to look for Abu Musab al-Zarqawi and another unnamed man. Two responses said, "we found no information to confirm the presence of the above mentioned in our area of operation. Please review, we suggest circulating the contents of this message."

19 August

- The UN Secretary-General rejects Iraq's 2 August proposal as the "wrong work program", but recommends that Iraq allow the return of weapons inspectors in accordance with United Nations Security Council Resolution 1284, passed in 1999.

=== September ===
12 September

- Bush, addressing the UN General Assembly, challenges the UN to confront the "grave and gathering danger" of Iraq or stand aside as the United States and likeminded nations act. The UN Security Council begins discussion on drafting a new resolution to encourage Iraq to comply with the previous sixteen UN resolutions.

22 September

- The British government places a dossier before Parliament giving its intelligence assessment of Iraq's WMD capability. The document alleges that Iraq possesses chemical weapons and biological weapons, and has restarted its nuclear weapons program. The document also asserts that Iraq has sought "significant quantities of uranium from Africa", and that some of the WMD would be ready within 45 minutes of an order to use them. Claims later leaked in May 2003 that the dossier was "sexed up" under pressure from Downing Street will lead to a media furore, and the apparent suicide of weapons inspector David Kelly.

26 September

- Secretary of Defense Donald Rumsfeld accuses Iraq of harboring al Qaeda terrorists and aiding their quest for weapons of mass destruction.
- The Bush administration says attempts by Iraq to acquire thousands of high-strength aluminum tubes points to a clandestine program to make enriched uranium for nuclear bombs. Indeed, Colin Powell, in his address to the U.N. Security Council just prior to the war, made reference to the aluminum tubes. But a report released by the Institute for Science and International Security in 2002 reported that it was highly unlikely that the tubes could be used to enrich uranium. Powell later admitted he had presented an inaccurate case to the United Nations on Iraqi weapons, and that the intelligence presented was in some cases "deliberately misleading."

=== October ===
3 October

- US Evangelical Christian leaders led by Richard Land of the Southern Baptist Convention send a letter to President Bush outlining the theological justification for a pre-emptive attack on Iraq.

10 October

- The United States Congress passes the Joint Resolution to Authorize the Use of United States Armed Forces Against Iraq.
- Canada announces that it not will be part of any military coalition sanctioned by the United Nations to invade Iraq.
- A few days before the U.S. Senate vote on the Authorization for Use of Military Force Against Iraq Resolution, about 75 senators are told in closed session that Saddam Hussein has the means of delivering biological and chemical weapons of mass destruction by unmanned aerial vehicle (UAV) drones that could be launched from ships off the Atlantic coast to attack U.S. eastern seaboard cities. Colin Powell suggested in his presentation to the United Nations that UAVs were transported out of Iraq and could be launched against the U.S. In fact, Iraq had no fleet of UAVs nor any capability of putting UAVs on ships. Iraq's UAV fleet consisted of less than a handful of outdated Czech training drones. At the time, there was a vigorous dispute within the intelligence community as to whether CIA conclusions about Iraqi UAVs were accurate. The U.S. Air Force agency most familiar with UAVs denied outright that Iraq possessed any offensive UAV capability.

=== November ===
8 November

- The UN Council votes unanimously for Resolution 1441, the 17th Iraq disarmament resolution passed by the council, calling for immediate and complete disarmament of Iraq. The resolution also demands that Iraq declare all weapons of mass destruction to the council, and account for its known chemical weapons material stockpiles.

13 November 2002

- Iraq accepts U.N. Security Council Resolution 1441 and informs the UN that it will abide by the resolution.
- Weapons inspectors arrive in Baghdad again after a four-year absence.

=== December ===
7 December

- Iraq files a 12,000-page weapons declaration with the UN in order to meet requirements of resolution 1441. UN weapons inspectors, the UN security council and the U.S. feel that this declaration fails to account for all of Iraq's chemical and biological agents.
- Turkey moves approximately 15,000 soldiers to the border with Iraq

19 December

- UNMOVIC Chairman Hans Blix tells UNSC members that the Iraqi weapons declaration filed on 7 December "is essentially a reorganized version" of information Iraq provided UNSCOM in 1997, and that it "is not enough to create confidence" that Iraq has abandoned its WMD efforts.

== 2003 ==
=== January ===
January 2003

- Turkey invites at least five other regional countries to a "'last-chance' meeting to avert a US-led war against Iraq."
- According to U.S. Intelligence, France has secretly sold prohibited spare parts to Iraq for its fighter jets and military helicopters.

18 January 2003

- Global protests against war on Iraq occur in cities around the world, including Tokyo, Moscow, Paris, London, Montreal, Ottawa, Toronto, Cologne, Bonn, Goteborg, Istanbul, and Cairo. NION and ANSWER hold protests in Washington D.C. and San Francisco, California.

January 2003

- A statement released to various newspapers and signed by the leaders of Britain, Spain, Italy, Portugal, Hungary, Poland, Denmark and the Czech Republic shows support for the US, saying that Saddam should not be allowed to violate U.N. resolutions. The statement goes on to say that Saddam is a "clear threat to world security," and urges Europe to unite with the United States to ensure that the Iraqi government is disarmed.

25 January 2003

- An international group of volunteers leaves London, heading for Baghdad to act as human shields. Most will leave in March fearing that they would actually become human shields.

27 January 2003

- Chairmen of the inspections effort report to the UN Security Council that, while Iraq has provided some access to facilities, concerns remain regarding undeclared material; inability to interview Iraqi scientists; inability to deploy aerial surveillance during inspections; and harassment of weapons inspectors.

31 January 2003

- Tony Blair meets George Bush at the White House. In a memo written by Blair's chief foreign adviser, Bush is paraphrased as saying: "The start date for the military campaign was now pencilled in for March 10. This was when the bombing would begin."

=== February ===
5 February 2003

- At the United Nations US Secretary of State Colin Powell presents the US government's case against the Saddam Hussein government of Iraq, as part of the diplomatic side of the U.S. plan to invade Iraq. The presentation includes tape recordings, satellite photographs and other intelligence data, and aims to prove WMD production, evasion of weapons inspections and a link to Al-Qaida.

7 February 2003

- The chief United Nations arms inspector Hans Blix says Iraq appears to be making fresh efforts to cooperate with U.N. teams hunting weapons of mass destruction, while Washington says the "momentum is building" for war with Iraq.

8 February 2003

- Sections of a new 'dossier' issued by the UK government, which purports to present the latest British intelligence about Iraq, and which has been cited by Tony Blair and Colin Powell as evidence for the need for war, are criticized as plagiarisms. Evidently they have been copied without permission from a number of sources including Jane's Intelligence Review and a 12-year-old doctoral thesis which was published in the US journal Middle East Review of International Affairs. Some sentences appear copied word-for-word with even spelling mistakes being reproduced from the original articles. Downing Street responds by saying that the government had never claimed exclusive authorship and that the information was accurate.

10 February 2003

- France and Belgium break the NATO procedure of silent approval concerning the timing of protective measures for Turkey in case of a possible war with Iraq. Germany says it supports this veto. The procedure was put into operation on 6 February by secretary general George Robertson. In response Turkey calls upon Article 4 of the NATO Treaty, which stipulates that member states must deliberate when asked to do so by another member state if it feels threatened.

12 February 2003

- An audio tape attributed to Osama bin Laden is released by al Jazeera television. It recounts the battle of Tora Bora and urges Muslims to fight the United States and to overthrow the Iraq government of Saddam Hussein.

13 February 2003

- A UN panel reports that Iraq's al-Samoud 2 missiles, disclosed by Iraq to weapons inspectors in December, have a range of 180 km (above the 150 km limit allowed by the UN), splitting opinion over whether they breach UNSCR 1441.
- Austria bars USA military units involved in the attack on Iraq from entering into or flying over its territories without a UN mandate to attack Iraq.
- The Washington Post claims that anonymous sources confirm that two Special Forces units have been operating on the ground inside Iraq for over a month, making preliminary preparations for a large-scale invasion.

14 February 2003

- A very large demonstration is held in Melbourne to protest against the Australian government's support for the USA's policy on Iraq. Organisers estimate that 200,000 people come out on to the streets, while some news sources put the number at "up to 150,000".
- UNMOVIC chief weapons inspectors Hans Blix and Mohamed ElBaradei present their second report to the United Nations Security Council. They state that the Iraqis have been co-operating well with the inspectors and that no weapons of mass destruction have been found, but that the Saddam Hussein government had still to account for many banned weapons believed to have been in his arsenal. Mr Blix also expresses doubts about some of the conclusions in Colin Powell's Security Council presentation of 5 February, and specifically questions the significance of some of the photographic evidence that Mr Powell has presented.

15 February 2003

- Global protests against war on Iraq: People around the world demonstrate against the planning of war against Iraq. In Rome one million people take to the streets, in London one million. In Berlin there are half a million in the largest demonstration for some decades. There are also protest marches all over France as well as in many other smaller European cities. Protests are also held in South Africa, Syria, India, Russia, Canada and in the US, in around 600 cities in total.

18 February 2003

- Hours before the first ships transporting heavy United States military equipment to Turkey were supposed to reach port, the Turkish government announces that it will withhold approval to dock unless the United States increases a reciprocal $6 billion foreign aid grant to $10 billion. The Bush administration indicates that no substantial changes will be made to the proposed aid package.

22 February 2003

- Bush meets with the Spanish president, Aznar, to discuss the Security Council situation. According to a leaked transcript of the meeting, Bush was using foreign aid and trade agreements to put pressure on Security Council members to support US policy. The transcript also revealed that Saddam had offered to go into exile if he was allowed to keep $1 billion and information on weapons of mass destruction.

24 February 2003

- Secretary of State Colin Powell states at a meeting in Beijing that "It is time to take action. The evidence is clear ... We are reaching that point where serious consequences must flow." His speech appears to imply that military action is likely to follow within three weeks, based on previous briefings from The Pentagon.

25 February 2003

- The United States, Britain and Spain present to the UN Security Council a much-anticipated second resolution stating that Iraq "has failed to take the final opportunity" to disarm, but does not include deadlines or an explicit threat of military force. Meanwhile, France, Germany, and Russia offer a counter-proposal calling for peaceful disarmament through further inspections.
- Both major parties of Kurdistan, an autonomous region in Northern Iraq, vow to fight Turkish troops if they enter Kurdistan to capture Mosul or interfere in Kurdish self-rule. Between them the two parties can mobilize up to 80,000 guerillas – most likely no match for the modern Turkish army, but a severe blow to the unity of U.S. allies on the Northern front expected in the U.S. plan to invade Iraq.

26 February 2003

- Hans Blix states that Iraq still has not made a "fundamental decision" to disarm, despite recent signs of increased cooperation. Specifically, Iraq has refused to destroy its al-Samoud 2 long range missiles. (These are not a WMD, and Iraq is permitted "battlefield" missiles. However, Iraq's missiles were limited by UN instruction to a diameter of 600mm, and the Al-Samoud II has a diameter of 760mm). These missiles are deployed and mobile. Also, an R-400 aerial bomb was found that could possibly contain biological agents. Given this find, the UN Inspectors have requested access to the Al-Aziziyah weapons range to verify that all 155 R-400 bombs can be accounted for and proven destroyed. Blix also expresses skepticism over Iraq's claims to have destroyed its stockpiles of anthrax and VX nerve agent in Time magazine. Blix said he found it "a bit odd" that Iraq, with "one of the best-organized regimes in the Arab world," would claim to have no records of the destruction of these illegal substances. "I don't see that they have acquired any credibility," Blix said
- George Bush commits publicly to a post-invasion democracy in Iraq, saying it will be "an example" to other nations in Arabia
- Tony Blair passes a motion in the British House of Commons supporting a new resolution at the UN Security Council and presumably authorizing a war (although the motion carefully avoids saying so). 120 UK Labour Party MPs dissent and vote against it – double the number who opposed the previous such motion – but the UK Conservative Party backs the government's motion.
- Saddam Hussein, in an interview with Dan Rather, rules out exile as an option.

27 February 2003

- UN Security Council meeting on Iraq ends without forming an agreement on timeline for further weapons inspections or future reports.

28 February 2003

- Iraq is expected to begin the process of destroying Al Samoud two missiles on Saturday. Hans Blix, U.N. chief weapons inspector says "It is a very significant piece of real disarmament". However, White House spokesman Ari Fleischer declares that the Iraq commitment to destroying these missiles is a fraud that President George W. Bush had predicted, and indicates that the United States wants a total and complete disarmament of Iraq. He also repeats that if the United Nations does not act to disarm Baghdad, the United States will lead a coalition of voluntary countries to disarm Saddam Hussein.

=== March ===
1 March 2003

- Under UN supervision, Iraq begins destroying four of its Al Samoud missiles.
- The Turkish speaker of Parliament voids the vote accepting U.S. troops involved in the planned invasion of Iraq into Turkey on constitutional grounds. 264 votes for and 250 against accepting 62,000 US military personnel do not constitute the necessary majority under the Turkish constitution, due to 19 abstentions.
- The United Arab Emirates calls for Iraqi president Saddam Hussein to step down to avoid war. The sentiment is later echoed by Kuwait.
- Many of the "human shields" begin to return to their home countries because the Iraqi government actually wanted to use them as human shields. The human shields that fled the country told reporters that the Iraqi government wanted them to sit at locations (power stations) that were quite likely to be bombed, not the hospitals they'd intended to defend. (The following year, at least one hospital was razed).

2 March 2003

- The country of Bahrain becomes the third Arab country to call for Iraqi president Saddam Hussein to step down. Kuwait and the United Arab Emirates had previously made similar announcements.
- The Observer publishes what it claims is a leaked memo dated 31 January 2003 ordering members of the NSA to spy on UN Security Council members, focussing especially on members from Angola, Cameroon, Chile, Mexico, Guinea, and Pakistan to try to determine how they will vote.
- Iraq destroys six more Al Samoud missiles, bringing the total destroyed to 10 out of an estimated 100 missiles ordered eliminated by the UN. The White House continues to dismiss Iraq's actions as "part of its game of deception." Iraq indicates that it may halt destruction of the missiles if the U.S. indicates it will go to war anyway.

3 March 2003

- Under intense American pressure, Turkey indicates that its Parliament will consider a second vote on whether to allow U.S. troops to use Turkish bases for a military attack on Iraq.
- Iraqi technicians use bulldozers to crush six more of the banned Al-Samoud 2 missiles, bringing to 16 the number destroyed in three days.

4 March 2003

- Iraq destroys three more Al Samoud 2 missiles, bringing to 19 the number Baghdad has crushed out of 100 ordered destroyed by the UN. Iraq also destroys a launcher and five engines in a rush to prove it is disarming before a crucial U.N. report on 7 March. UN Secretary-General Kofi Annan calls the new actions "a positive development" while the White House remains unconvinced saying, "Despite whatever limited head-fakes Iraq has engaged in, they continue to fundamentally not disarm."

5 March 2003

- Pope John Paul II calls on Catholics to commemorate Ash Wednesday by fasting and praying for peace. He sends an envoy, Cardinal Pio Laghi, to President Bush, to urge him not to go to war. Laghi tells Bush that the Pope believes that a war would be a "defeat for humanity" and would be neither morally nor legally justified.
- Two days before his scheduled update to the United Nations on Iraqi cooperation with inspection, Hans Blix credits Iraq with "a great deal more of cooperation now", although still expressing some skepticism as to whether or not the cooperation would continue. Among the examples of cooperation that he cites are Iraq's destruction of Samoud 2 missiles, which he calls "the most spectacular and the most important and tangible". He adds that "here weapons that can be used in war are being destroyed in fairly large quantities." In general, he states, "you have a greater measure of cooperation on interviews in general." These statements help to harden the opposition to the US-led war by several other Security Council members. (It was later found that Blix had found and destroyed almost the only illegal weapons in Iraq – and they were not WMD).
- Secretary of State Colin Powell says that US intelligence has indicated that Hussein has ordered the production of more Al Samoud 2 missiles parts and engines. The Iraqi government does not deny the claim but simply says once again that they considered the missiles to be legal. Powell also points out that Iraq has delivered "some documents that have not been found before"
- Iraq destroys nine more Al Samoud 2 missiles, bringing to 28 the total number of missiles scrapped.

6 March 2003

- United States intelligence reports that the Iraqi government has ordered US military uniforms with plans of carrying out attacks on Iraqi citizens which would then be blamed on US soldiers. (Reuters)
- Iraqi exiles testify in Washington about the brutal crimes committed against Iraqi citizens by the Hussein government. One Iraqi woman says that the Iraqi people are "patiently waiting" for the US to liberate the country. Another woman says that war protesters are "ignorant and misinformed".
- Iraq flattens six more Al Samoud 2 missiles, meaning the country has now destroyed 34 of its known stock of 100 of the banned rockets.
- China joins France, Russia, and Germany in putting itself officially on record as opposing a US-led war. Jiang Zemin is quoted as saying, "The door of peace should not be closed."
- US President George W. Bush holds a live, televised press conference on the latest developments in the War on Terrorism, the situation with North Korea and the standoff with Iraq.

7 March 2003

- The Washington Times publishes a report detailing recent US intelligence showing that France has been secretly selling spare parts to Iraq for its fighter jets and military helicopters during the past several months. Other intelligence reports indicate that Iraq had succeeded in acquiring French weaponry illegally for years.
- The German newspaper Die Tageszeitung claims that at the request of the United States, the 12,000-page Iraqi weapons declaration was largely censored before being submitted to the UN, in order to remove references to Western countries that supplied arms to Iraq. Only some 3,000 pages were left after the censorship; newspaper had obtained copies of the censored report, which references such companies as Honeywell among a chief supplier of Iraqi arms. The list of American companies can be found at
- Hans Blix reports to the UN Security Council. Blix says, "No evidence of proscribed activities have so far been found," saying that progress was made in inspections which would continue. Blix files a 173-page document with the Security Council which says that inspectors discovered an undeclared Iraqi drone, with a wingspan of 7.45 metres (24 feet 5 inches), suggesting an illegal range beyond 150 km. US satellites tracked test flights of these drones, which were mentioned by Secretary of State Powell on 5 March. Powell claimed that the test flight far exceeded the legal range agreed to by Iraq under UN resolutions. The Iraqis showed journalists this 'drone'. It was primitive, and could only be flown within "line of sight". Blix was strongly criticized in some UK and US press for not having found and declared this large model aircraft.
- Mohamed ElBaradei, head of the International Atomic Energy Agency, concludes that the documents the US and Britain offered as "proof" that Iraq had attempted to import uranium from Niger were in fact fraudulent. This "proof" was a key part of the US accusation that Iraq was restarting its nuclear weapons program. ElBaradei says, "Based on thorough analysis, the IAEA has concluded ... that these documents, which formed the basis for the reports of recent uranium transactions between Iraq and Niger, are in fact not authentic." He concludes, "We have therefore concluded that these specific allegations are unfounded."
- International peacekeepers in Kuwait file a complaint to the UN Security Council that US Marines have been cutting holes in the fence on the UN-patrolled border between Kuwait and Iraq. Fred Eckhard, a UN spokesman who filed the complaint, says that this activity may violate the Security Council resolution that set up the zone, but adds that it was up to the UN Security Council to make a determination.
- Amendments are added to the 2003 US-British-Spanish Draft Resolution on Iraq, setting a deadline of 17 March. The draft is withheld when it becomes clear that the resolution will not pass.

9 March 2003

- Near the Iraq/Kuwait border, a dozen Iraqi soldiers attempt to surrender to British paratroopers who are testing their weapons during a routine exercise. The stunned soldiers from the 16 Air Assault Brigade inform the Iraqis that they were not firing at them, and tell them it is too early to surrender.

11 March 2003

- Iraqi fighters threaten two US U-2 surveillance planes forcing them to abort their mission and return to base. Iraqi officials describe the incident as a "technical mistake" by the U.N. inspectors. Ewen Buchanan, spokesman for UNMOVIC, says that Iraqi officials had been notified about the flight beforehand.
- According to Arab media, Saddam Hussein has opened training camps in Iraq for Arab volunteers willing to carry out suicide bombings against U.S. forces, if an attack on Iraq takes place.

12 March 2003

- British prime minister Tony Blair proposes an amendment to the possible 18th resolution which would call for Iraq to meet certain benchmarks to prove that it was disarming. The benchmarks include a televised speech from Hussein declaring the country's intentions to disarm, and accounting for Iraq's chemical weapons stockpiles and unmanned drones. France once again threatens to veto even if a majority of the council votes in favor of the resolution.

13 March 2003

- Reports claim that a large portion of Iraqi military is ready to surrender if a war begins. Defence Secretary Donald Rumsfeld admits that the U.S. government is communicating with Iraqi soldiers. It had been known for some time that the U.S. military was communicating with Iraqi soldiers via email.

16 March 2003

- The leaders of the United States, Britain, Portugal and Spain meet at a summit in the Azores Islands. President Bush calls Monday, 17 March, the "moment of truth", meaning that the "coalition of the willing" would make its final effort to extract a resolution from the U.N. Security Council that would give Iraq an ultimatum to disarm immediately or to be disarmed by force.
- The United States advises U.N. weapons inspectors to leave Iraq.
- The United States orders all non-essential diplomats out of Kuwait, Syria, and Israel.
- Anti-Saddam Iraqi groups begin defacing and vandalising posters of the dictator all over Iraq. Demonstrations also take place in Kirkuk, where an estimated crowd of 20,000 marched on the Ba'ath party's main administrative headquarters demanding the overthrow of Saddam's government. Three posters of the Iraqi leader were torn to pieces and a grenade was thrown at the government building. Some reports indicate that one senior Ba'ath party official was killed in the attack.

17 March 2003

- In a televised speech, U.S. President George W. Bush gives Saddam Hussein 48 hours to go into exile or face war.
- U.S. Intelligence reports that Iraqi soldiers in Southern Iraq have been armed with chemical weapons.
- France announces that it would support U.S. troops if Iraq launches chemical weapons against U.S. forces.

18 March 2003

- Saddam Hussein rejects the exile option.

19 March 2003

- 15 Iraqi soldiers surrender near the Kuwait border.
- British defense sources claim that Saddam Hussein may use chemical weapons on his Iraqi people and blame the attacks on coalition forces as part of a propaganda war. Earlier in the year, Hussein equipped part of the Iraqi military with look-alike U.S. uniforms.
- U.S. warplanes bomb Iraqi artillery in range of U.S. soldiers.

== See also ==
Timeline of the 2003 invasion of Iraq
