= Al Aziziyah =

Al Aziziyah may refer to:

- Al-Aziziyah, district of Al-Hasakah, Syria
- Al-Aziziyah (Iraq), town in Iraq
- ‘Aziziya, city in Libya
