= Sabhan Adam =

Syrian plastic artist

Sabhan Adam سبهان آدم
- Born: 19 January 1973 (age 53); Al-Hasakah, Syria
- Known for: Painting, sculpture, drawing
- Movement: Plastic arts
- Website: sabhanadam.com

Sabhan Adam (Arabic: سبهان آدم; born 19 January 1973) is a Syrian plastic artist.
