= Tall Sulaymānī =

Climate chart (precipitation, max. and min. temperature)
J	F	M	A	M	J	J	A	S	O	N	D
51 11 1	41 15 3	37 24 7	17 29 10	35 41 16	1 45 23	1 44 27	1 43 26	6 45 21	30 36 15	65 24 6	57 15 1
- █ Average max. and min. temperatures in °C
- █ Precipitation totals in mm
Imperial conversion
J	F	M	A	M	J	J	A	S	O	N	D
2 52 34	1.6 59 37	1.5 75 45	0.7 84 50	1.4 106 61	0 113 73	0 111 81	0 109 79	0.2 113 70	1.2 97 59	2.6 75 43	2.2 59 34
- █ Average max. and min. temperatures in °F
- █ Precipitation totals in inches

Tall Sulaymānī (Arabic: تل سليماني) is a hill in Syria. It is located in al-Hasakah province, in the northeastern part of the country, 500 kilometers northeast of the capital Damascus. The peak of Tall Sulaymānī is 304 meters above sea level.

Tall Sulaymānī is an archaeological tell, an artificial mound formed from the accumulated refuse of generations of people living on the same site for hundreds or thousands of years. The word tell itself is derived from Arabic tall. The terrain around Tall Sulaymānī is flat. The highest point nearby is Tell Kawkab, 526 meters above sea level, 9.9 kilometers east of Tall Sulaymānī. The closest major community is Al-Hasakah, 7.6 kilometers south of Tall Sulaymānī.

The area around Tall Sulaymānī consists mostly of agricultural land. Around Tall Sulaymānī it is quite densely populated, with 179 inhabitants per square kilometer. A warm steppe climate prevails in the area. The annual average temperature in the neighborhood is 22 °C. The warmest month is July, when the average temperature is 36 °C, and the coldest is January, with 6 °C. The average annual rainfall is 343 millimeters. The driest month is November, with 65 mm of precipitation on average, and the driest is August, with 1 mm of rainfall.
