= Al-Madinah, Al-Hasakah =

Al-Madinah
- District
- Country: Syria
- City: Al-Hasakah

Population (2004 census)
  - Total: 30,436

Al-Madinah (Arabic: المدينة), also known as the City Center, is a district of Al-Hasakah, Syria.
