= Preparations for the 2003 invasion of Iraq =

The 2003 invasion of Iraq began on March 20. On March 18, US President George W. Bush had set a deadline for the ruler of Iraq, Saddam Hussein, and his two sons, Uday and Qusay, to leave the country or face military action. By the time of the ultimatum, political and military preparations for the invasion were well advanced.

Plans for securing Iraqi cities following the invasion, infrastructure reconstruction, and transitioning the country into a post-war government – plans to "win the peace" — were either nonexistent or woefully inadequate. The lack of a post-invasion security plan allowed widespread looting and the violent insurgency that immediately followed the invasion. The looting "caused far more damage to Iraq's infrastructure than the bombing campaign" and suggested to the insurgents that the US military was vulnerable. The Special Inspector General for Iraq Reconstruction wrote, "There was insufficient systematic planning for human capital management in Iraq before and during the U.S.-directed stabilization and reconstruction operations."

Former UK Minister of Defence Geoff Hoon commented on this issue in 2007 and said, "There was an enormous amount of post-war planning. It's one of the things that the newspapers have never troubled to look at. I accept, and I've said so publicly, that we perhaps did not anticipate quite the kinds of trouble that we would have. I think we thought that because the population of Iraq hated Saddam Hussein, they would simply come out on the streets and everything would be fine... I don't think we quite estimated the degree of control that Saddam's people had in Iraqi society... So the kind of things we were planning for, with the benefit of hindsight, perhaps weren't quite the right things. But they were the right things in terms of the problems that we anticipated, which was the lack of food, water. We probably didn't quite appreciate, as I say, the ruthlessness of some of Saddam's [followers]."

== Political preparations ==
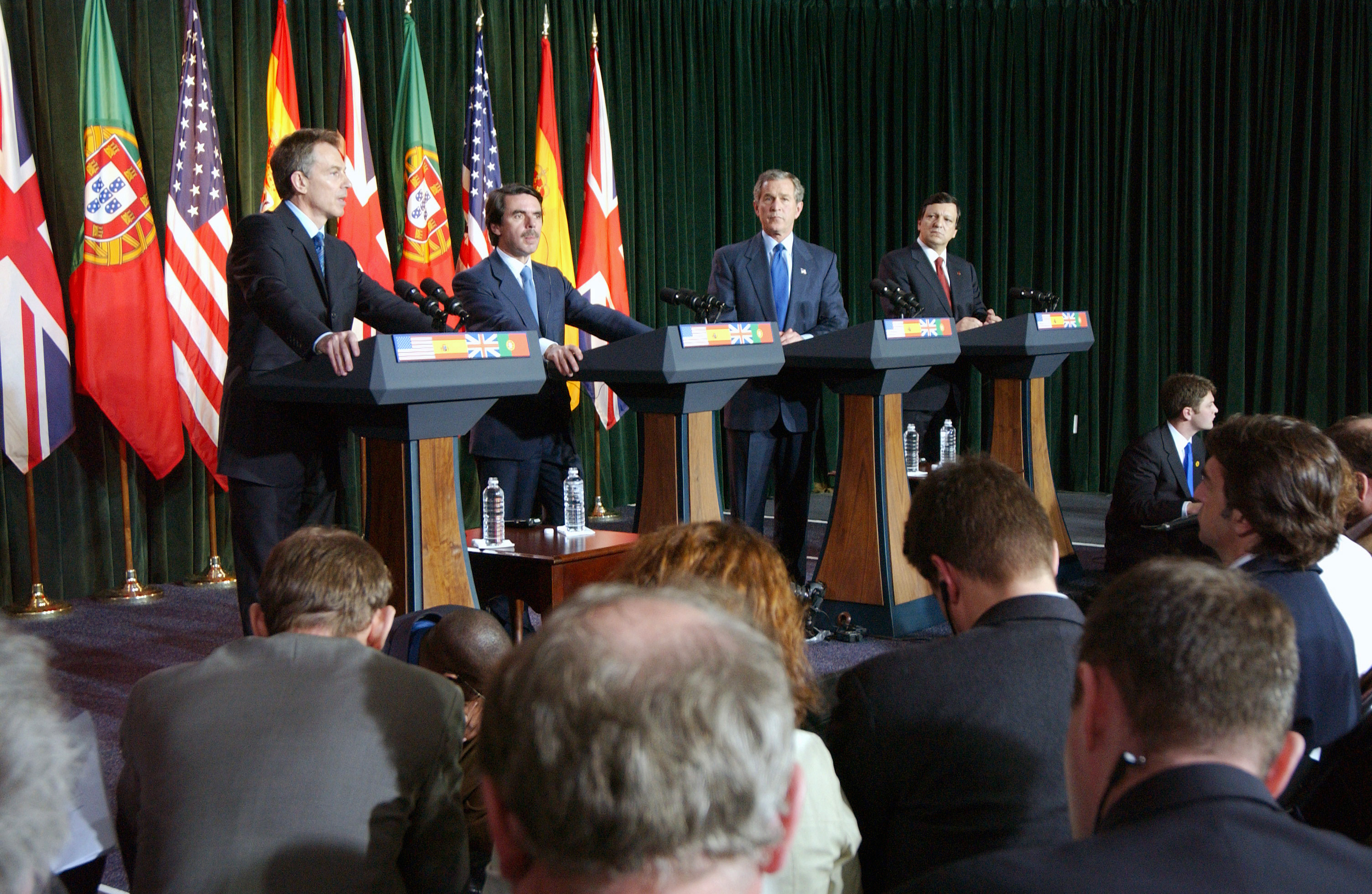
Tony Blair, José Maria Aznar, George W. Bush, and José Manuel Barroso in a joint press briefing following a one-day emergency summit meeting at Lajes Field to discuss the possibilities of war in Iraq

Political preparation for war began in earnest during the period of weapons inspections in Iraq over the winter of 2002–2003, carried out by a team led by Hans Blix with the authority of United Nations Security Council Resolution 1441. The U.S. and its principal allies, the United Kingdom, Spain and Portugal, maintained a skeptical position on the results of the inspections procedure. Under pressure from his Secretary of State, Colin Powell, and his main ally, the UK, President Bush decided to try to obtain UN backing for an invasion. The so-called "second resolution" (the first being 1441) was eventually drafted and presented to the UN Security Council. It was a tough resolution, calling for immediate compliance with the previous resolutions requiring disarmament, and setting a 10-day deadline for compliance. Critics saw it as an unrealistic ultimatum designed to provide the U.S. with a cause for war, and it met considerable opposition in the security council, with opponents including the permanent members France, China, and Germany. After a period of intense diplomacy, President Bush met with his British, Spanish and Portuguese counterparts, Prime Minister Tony Blair, Prime Minister José María Aznar and Prime Minister José Manuel Barroso in the Azores, Portugal on March 15 and 16. Declaring that "diplomacy had failed," he announced the intention to drop the proposed resolution. Subsequently, both the U.S. and the UK accused France of effectively blocking the negotiations by threatening to veto the proposed resolution "whatever the circumstances", but France maintained that its position had been intentionally misconstrued. Lacking the "second resolution", the U.S. announced its intention to attack Iraq regardless if Saddam Hussein did not abdicate.

The U.S.'s rationale for war depended on several contentions. First, it contended that Iraq was in possession of weapons of mass destruction, which it claimed he might be willing to supply to terrorists. Second, it accused Iraq of supporting terrorism, notably through payments to families of Palestinian suicide bombers. In this way, the U.S. contended, Iraq presented a threat that it would be justified in removing, placing this as a new interpretation of the doctrine of self-defense. Third, it stated that the U.S. was legally justified in taking military action by previous UN resolutions, most notably 1441, which stated that "serious consequences" would result from a failure to disarm on Iraq's part.

== See also ==
- Iraq disarmament crisis
- United Nations Security Council and the Iraq War
- Views on the 2003 invasion of Iraq
- Iraq disarmament crisis timeline 1990-1996, 1997–2000, 2001–2003
- Iraq and weapons of mass destruction
- International reactions to the prelude to the Iraq War
