= Nashwan (disambiguation) =

Nashwan (1986–2002) was a Thoroughbred racehorse.

Nashwan may also refer to:

- Nashwan Al-Harazi, Yemeni gymnast
- Nashwan al-Himyari, Yemeni theologian
- Nashwan Abdulrazaq Abdulbaqi, Iraqi Al-Qaeda member known by the nom de guerre Abdul Hadi al Iraqi

== See also ==
- Nashwa (disambiguation), for the feminine version of Nashwan
