= Hasakah =

Hasakah الحسكة Hesîçê/Hesekê ܚܣܝܟܐ
- City
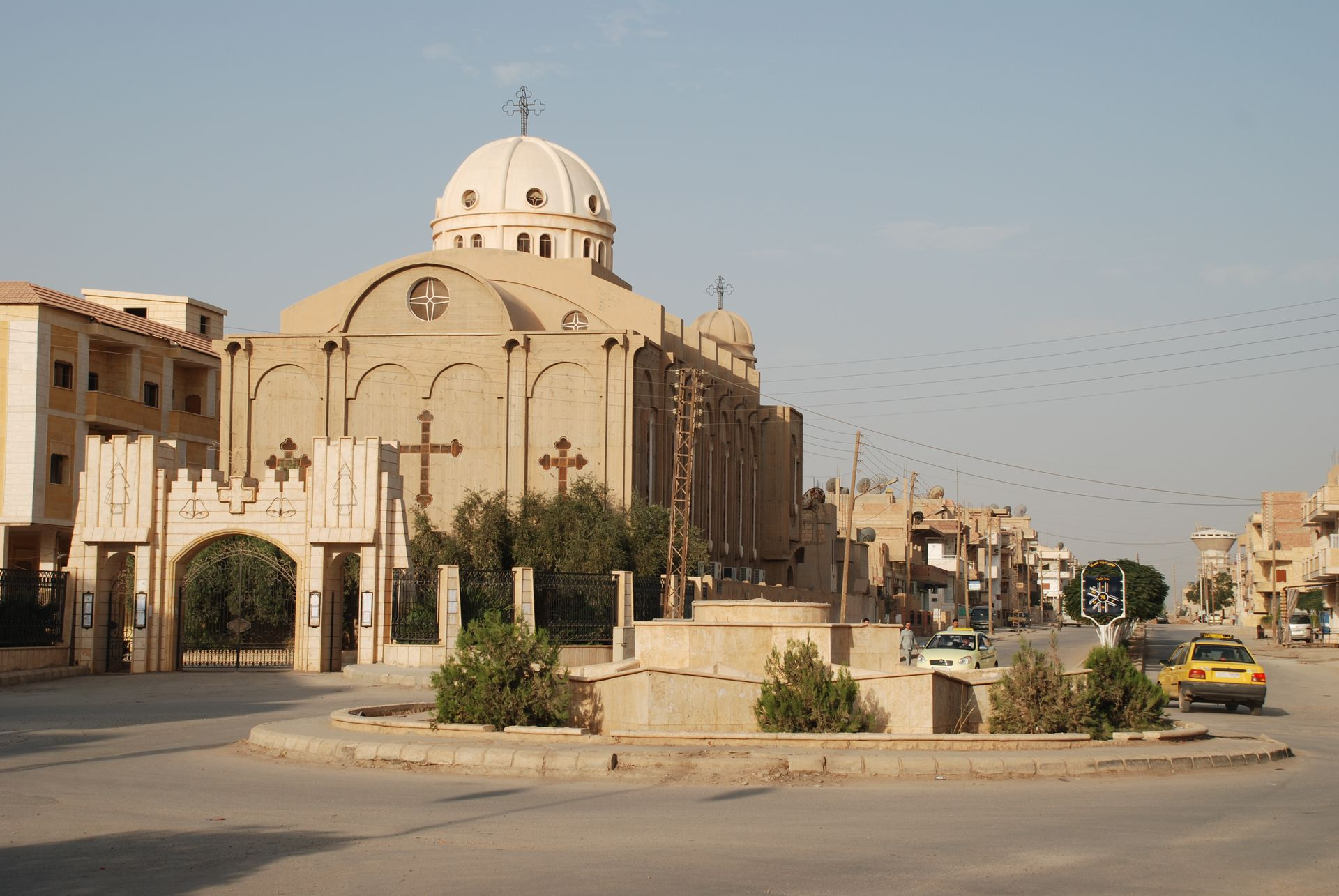
- Assyrian church in Hasakah

- Location in Syria
- Coordinates: 36°30′42″N 40°44′32″E
- Country: Syria
- Governorate: Hasakah
- District: Hasakah
- Subdistrict: Hasakah
- Elevation: 300 m (980 ft)

Population
  - Estimate (2023): 422,445
- Demonym(s): Arabic: حسكاوي, romanized: Ḥaskāwi
- Time zone: UTC+3 (AST)
- Area code: 52
- Geocode: C4360

Hasakah (Note: Also known as Al-Hasakah, or Al-Hasaka (Arabic: ٱلْحَسَكَة, romanized: al-Ḥasaka; Kurdish: Hesîçê/Hesekê; Syriac: ܚܣܝܟܐ, romanized: Hasake)) is a city in northeastern Syria and the capital of the Hasakah Governorate. With a 2023 estimated population of 422,445, Hasakah is populated by Arabs, Kurds, Assyrians and a smaller number of Armenians and Chechens. Hasakah is 80 kilometres (50 miles) south of the city of Qamishli. The Khabur River, a tributary of the Euphrates River, flows west–east through the city. The Jaghjagh River flows into the Khabur from the north at Hasakah. After Ayn Issa came under the control of the Syrian transitional government, Hasakah became the new capital of the DAANES.

It is characterized by its fertile lands, abundant water, beautiful nature, and numerous archaeological sites. It has also witnessed a major modern urban renaissance, and numerous agricultural and industrial projects have been established around it. Over the past two decades, it has suffered from the drying up of its main river, the Khabur, which has led to the loss of much of its agricultural land, forcing many of its people to migrate internally to the interior provinces, especially the capital of Syria, Damascus, and Daraa in the south, to work in industrial factories and on agricultural lands.

== History ==
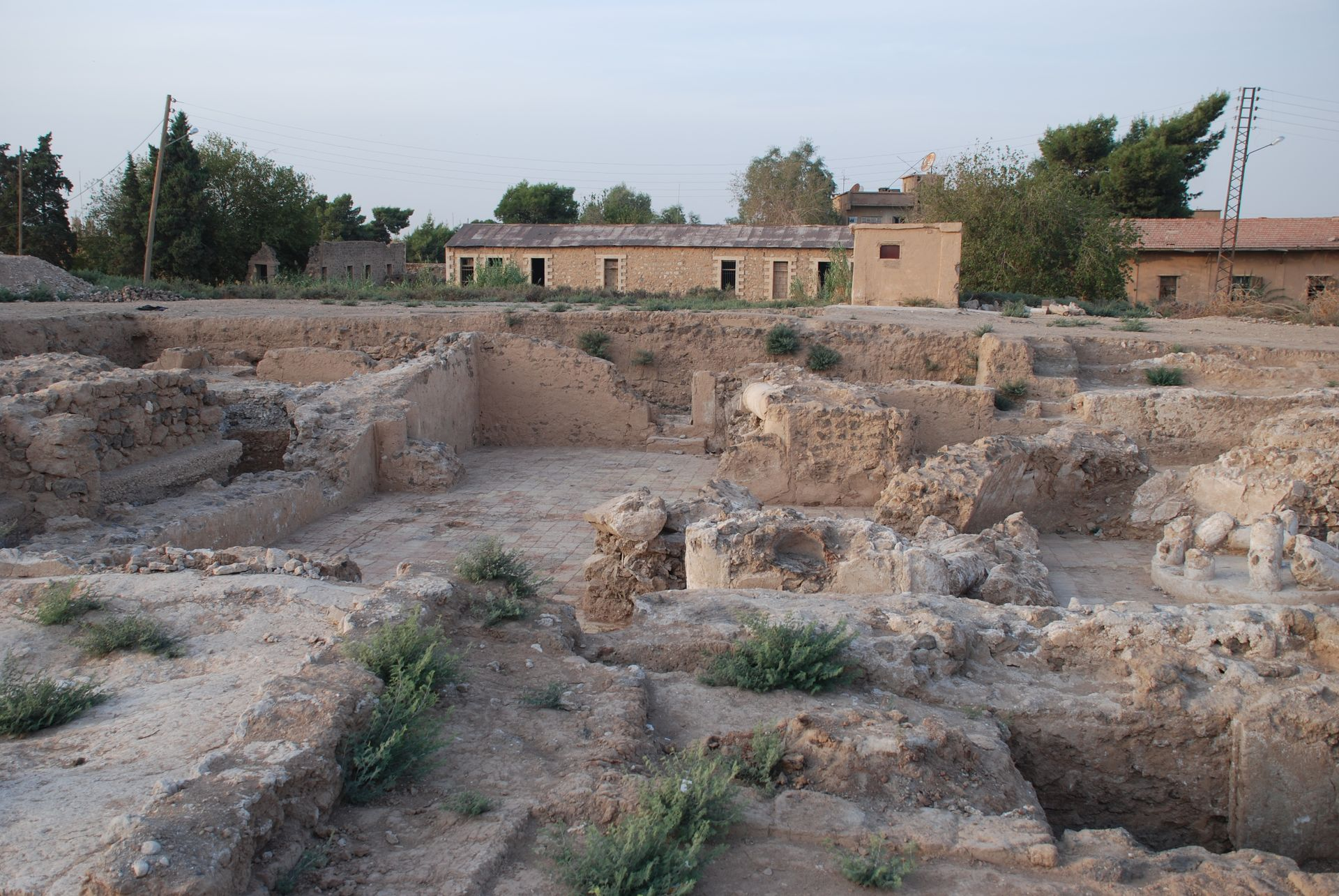
Excavations in 2007 on Citadel Hill. A barracks from the time of the French Mandate of Syria can be seen in the background.

=== Early history ===
An ancient tell has been identified in the city centre by Dominique Charpin as the location of the city of Qirdahat. Another possibility is that it was the site of the ancient Aramean city of Magarisu, mentioned by the Assyrian king Ashur-bel-kala, who fought the Arameans near the city. The etymology of Magarisu is Aramaic (from the root mgrys) and means "pasture land". The city was the capital of the Aramean state of Bit-Yahiri, which was invaded by Assyrian kings Tukulti-Ninurta II and Ashurnasirpal II.

Excavations in the tell discovered remains dating to the Middle-Assyrian, Byzantine and Islamic eras. The last level of occupation ended in the fifteenth century. A period of 1,500 years separated the Middle-Assyrian and Byzantine levels.

There are numerous other archaeological tells in the surrounding area, such as Tall Sulaymānī, which is 7.6 kilometers to the north of the city.

In Ottoman times, the town was insignificant. Today's settlement was established in April 1922 as a French military post, which soon grew into a town. The establishment of new cities in northern Syria was deemed necessary by the authorities of the French Mandate because after the foundation of Turkey, all major economic centers were allocated to Turkey. After the Armenian genocide and Assyrian genocide in the Ottoman Empire, many refugees fled to the area after their expulsion and began to develop it in the 1920s.

=== Contemporary ===
During the French mandate period, Assyrians fleeing ethnic cleansing in Iraq during the Simele massacre, established numerous villages along the Khabur River during the 1930s. French troops were stationed on Citadel Hill at that time. In 1942, there were 7,835 inhabitants in Hasakah, several schools, two churches and a gas station. The new city grew from the 1950s to become the administrative centre of the region. The economic boom in the cities of Qamishli and Hasakah was a result of the irrigation projects started in the 1960s, which transformed northeastern Syria into a cotton-growing area.

On 23 March 1993, a large fire broke out in the Al-Hasakah Central Prison after prisoners protested the conditions there, leaving 61 inmates dead and 90 others injured. The detainees accused the police chief and the Syrian forces of having set the fire. The government blamed five inmates, who were executed on 24 May 1993.

=== Syrian Civil War ===
Frontlines in Hasakah prior to October 14, 2019 Syrian Government control Syrian Kurdish control

On 26 January 2011, in one of the first events of the 2011 Syrian protests, Hasan Ali Akleh from Hasakah poured gasoline on himself and set himself on fire, in the same way Tunisian Mohamed Bouazizi had in Tunis on 17 December 2010. According to eyewitnesses, the action was "a protest against the Syrian government".

In the Battle of Hasakah of summer 2015, the Syrian Government lost control of much of the city to the Islamic State, which was then captured by the Kurdish YPG. Afterwards, some 75% of Hasakah and all of the surrounding countryside were under the administration of the Federation of Northern Syria – Rojava, while only some inner-city areas were controlled by the Syrian government. The United Nations estimates that violence related to the civil War has displaced up to 120,000 people. On 1 August 2016, the Syrian Democratic Council opened a public office in Hasakah.

On 16 August 2016, the Battle of al-Hasakah (2016) started, with the YPG and Asayish capturing most of the remaining areas held by government forces. On 23 August 2016, an agreement between the YPG and the Syrian Army resulted in a ceasefire within the city. Al-Hasakah has since been part of the Jazira Region in the framework of the Democratic Autonomous Administration of North and East Syria.

On 20 January 2022, al-Sina'a prison came under attack by Islamic State forces who attempted to free ex-IS fighters incarcerated there. Following the initial attack, clashes spread to the neighbourhoods of al-Zuhour and Ghuwayran as imprisoned Islamic State militants attempted to escape. After a 6-day battle, SDF and Coalition forces managed to push back the attack and secure the area. After thwarting their attack on Ghweran prison, they barricaded themselves in the Faculty of Economics building in the Syrian government-controlled areas in the city of Hasakah, targeting civilians and the movements of the internal security forces' vehicles. Accordingly, international coalition warplanes bombed the college building.

==== Hasakah Security Box ====
The Hasakah "Security Box" was a Syrian government enclave within Hasakah, established in August 2016. It contained a prison, immigration office, mayor's palace, police headquarters, and local army command center.

Following the capture of the city from ISIS in 2015, government forces controlled 25% of the city while the YPG controlled 75%. On August 16, 2016, a small skirmish erupted into the Second Battle of al-Hasakah between the Asayish alongside the YPG and the Syrian government. After a week-long battle, Kurdish fighters secured control of over 95% of the city. Russia mediated a ceasefire that was put into place on August 23, 2016, according to which only police officers and interior ministry forces were allowed to return to the "Security Box" to protect the government's department buildings.

In July 2018, the Syrian Army raised the Syrian flag over the Al-Nashwa District, which was previously controlled by the YPG and the Asayish security forces in the city of Hasakah. However, in September through November 2019, Asayish forces were still present in al-Nashwa district and able to make arrests.

In January 2021, government-controlled parts of Al-Hasakah and Qamishli, came under siege by the Asayish due to disputes with the Damascus government.

In March 2023, the US conducted retaliation strikes against IRGC forces in the city, after a drone attack which killed a US contractor.

In August 2024, the SDF imposed another week-long siege on the enclave in retaliation for cross-border attacks by tribal militias on SDF positions in Deir ez-Zor, originating from government-controlled areas. The siege was once again lifted through Russian mediation efforts.

==== After the fall of the Assad regime ====
The city came under full control of the Kurdish forces on December 6–7, 2024 after the fall of the Assad Regime. Ba'athist Syrian forces handed over control of the remaining territory to the Syrian Democratic Forces (SDF) with no resistance.

Following the 2026 northeastern Syria offensive, the Syrian transitional government forces entered the city on 2 February as part of a ceasefire agreement.

== Climate ==
Al-Hasakah has a Mediterranean-influenced semi-arid climate (BSh) with very hot dry summers and cool wet winters with occasional frosty nights.

Climate data for Al-Hasakah (1961–1990)
Month	Jan	Feb	Mar	Apr	May	Jun	Jul	Aug	Sep	Oct	Nov	Dec	Year
Mean daily maximum °C (°F)	10.7 (51.3)	13.4 (56.1)	17.9 (64.2)	23.6 (74.5)	30.6 (87.1)	36.6 (97.9)	40.2 (104.4)	39.5 (103.1)	35.5 (95.9)	28.2 (82.8)	19.6 (67.3)	12.5 (54.5)	25.7 (78.3)
Daily mean °C (°F)	5.2 (41.4)	7.4 (45.3)	11.3 (52.3)	16.4 (61.5)	22.6 (72.7)	28.3 (82.9)	31.5 (88.7)	30.4 (86.7)	25.8 (78.4)	19.1 (66.4)	11.7 (53.1)	6.7 (44.1)	18.0 (64.4)
Mean daily minimum °C (°F)	0.6 (33.1)	2.4 (36.3)	4.9 (40.8)	9.3 (48.7)	14.1 (57.4)	19.1 (66.4)	22.4 (72.3)	21.5 (70.7)	16.4 (61.5)	10.8 (51.4)	5.2 (41.4)	2.2 (36.0)	10.9 (51.6)
Average precipitation mm (inches)	51.5 (2.03)	41.3 (1.63)	44.1 (1.74)	49.0 (1.93)	18.2 (0.72)	0.5 (0.02)	0.2 (0.01)	0.0 (0.0)	2.1 (0.08)	16.5 (0.65)	23.3 (0.92)	42.2 (1.66)	288.9 (11.37)
Average precipitation days (≥ 1.0 mm)	7.0	6.4	6.6	6.2	2.7	0.2	0.1	0.0	0.1	2.5	3.8	6.2	41.8
Mean monthly sunshine hours	142.6	159.6	210.8	234.0	303.8	357.0	393.7	356.5	297.0	248.0	192.0	142.6	3,037.6
Mean daily sunshine hours	4.6	5.7	6.8	7.8	9.8	11.9	12.7	11.5	9.9	8.0	6.4	4.6	8.7
Source: NOAA

== Demographics ==
Historical population
Year	Pop.	±%
1942	7,835	—
1981	73,426	+837.2%
1994	119,798	+63.2%
2004	188,160	+57.1%

In 1939, French mandate authorities reported the following population numbers for different ethnic/religious groups in al-Hasakah city centre:

Arabs	Kurds	Assyrians	Armenians
7,133	360	5700	500

In 1992, Al-Hasakah was described as "an Arab city with a growing Kurdish population." Christians—mostly Assyrians, plus a smaller number of Armenians—also live in the city. In 2004, the city's population was 188,160. Al-Hasakah has an ethnically diverse population of Arabs, Kurds and Assyrians, with a smaller number of Armenians.

== Religion ==
There are more than forty mosques in the city, as well as at least nine church buildings, serving a large number of Christians of various rites. The Cathedral of the Assumption of Mary is the episcopal see of the non-metropolitan Syriac Catholic Archeparchy of Al Hasakah-Nisibis, which depends directly on the Syriac Catholic Patriarch of Antioch.

=== Churches in the city ===
- Syriac Orthodox Cathedral of Saint George (كاتدرائية مار جرجس للسريان الأرثوذكس)
- Syriac Orthodox Church of Our Lady (كنيسة السيدة العذراء للسريان الأرثوذكس)
- Syriac Catholic Church of Our Lady of the Assumption (كنيسة سيدة الإنتقال للسريان الكاثوليك)
- Assyrian Church of Our Lady (كنيسة السيدة العذراء للآشوريين)
- Chaldean Catholic Church of Jesus the King (كنيسة يسوع الملك للكلدان الكاثوليك)
- Armenian Orthodox Church of Saint John the Baptist (كنيسة القديس مار يوحنا المعمدان للأرمن الأرثوذكس)
- Armenian Catholic Church of the Holy Family (كنيسة العائلة المقدسة للأرمن الكاثوليك)
- National Evangelical Presbyterian Church (الكنيسة الإنجيلية المشيخية الوطنية)
- Jesus The Light of the World National Evangelical Church (كنيسة الاتحاد المسيحي يسوع نور العالم)

== Economy ==
=== Agriculture and natural resources ===
The economy of Hasaka is based on agriculture. The Jazira region, in which the city is situated, has long been known as "breadbasket" and "green island". In 2011, the region's wheat production made up 55% of Syria's total output, with Hasakah alone contributing more than 50%. Meanwhile, the region's cotton yield made up 78% of Syria's total production during that year, with Hasakah contributing 35%.

In 2011, the Al-Hasakah Governorate accounted for roughly 200,000 barrels per day (bpd) of Syria's output of around 380,000 bpd. The region also holds a substantial amount of natural gas reserves.

Following the Syrian civil war and in particular the Turkish occupation of Rojava many acres of farmland were rendered unusable, as Turkish forces cut off the Allouk water station in Serê Kaniyê (Raʾs al-ʿAin). This also led to a deterioration in the city's health conditions. Additionally Abdullah Al-Fares, a professor of economics at the University of Aleppo, attributes the decline in agricultural output to prolonged droughts, decreasing rainfall, large-scale displacement of farmers, rising production costs, a reduction in irrigated farmland due to soaring fuel prices and power outages, the lack of fertilizer, and a decline in seed quality. The displacement of farmers and power outages in particular were caused by Turkish airstrikes, which severely damaged the Hasakah region's only power station. Oil extraction in the region also stalled as energy became scarce, oil tankers were targeted by ISIS sleeper cells, and roads and infrastructure were damaged by Turkish airstrikes.

=== Development under the DAANES ===
Over the years various projects have been undertaken by the Autonomous Administration's Economic Authority and the Kongreya Star to improve the city's economic standing and promote women's empowerment. These include agricultural projects for displaced women from Serê Kaniyê, the Centre for Co-operative Societies, which cultivates barley in the region, the Ishtar Women’s Bakery, Demsal (lit. Season), which offers seasonal products, as well as numerous sewing and textile workshops, canned food factories, dairy farms, restaurants, and clothing shops.

== Districts ==
The city of Hasakah is divided into 5 districts, which are Al-Madinah, Al-Aziziyah, Ghuwayran, Al-Nasra and Al-Nashwa. These districts, in turn, are divided into 29 neighborhoods.

English Name	Arabic Name	Population	Neighborhoods (Population)
Al-Madinah	المدينة	30,436	Al-Matar al-Shamali (9,396), Center / Al-Wusta (6,067), Municipal Stadium / Al-Malaab al-Baladi (5,802), Al-Matar al-Janoubi (4,714), Al-Askari (4,457)
Al-Aziziyah	العزيزية	56,123	Al-Salehiyah (21,319), Al-Ghazal (11,199), National Hospital / Al-Mashfa al-Watani (11,108), Al-Talaia (4,883), Abou Amshah (4,435), Al-Mufti (3,179)
Ghuwayran	غويران	34,191	Sports City / Al-Madinah al-Riyadiyah (8,418), Al-Thawra (8,180), Al-Taqaddum (7,623), 16 Tishreen (5,595), Al-Zuhour (3,367), Abou Bakr (1,008)
Al-Nasra	الناصرة	42,070	Tell Hajjar (10,343), Al-Kallasah (9,721), Al-Meshirfah (8,074), Al-Qusour (7,672), Al-Beitra (2,423), Al-Mashtal (2,306), Al-Maaishiyah (1,531)
Al-Nashwa	النشوة	25,340	Al-Rasafah (12,618), Al-Masaken (4,968), Al-Khabour (3,805), Al-Liliyah (2,977), Villas / Al-Villat (972)

== Sports ==
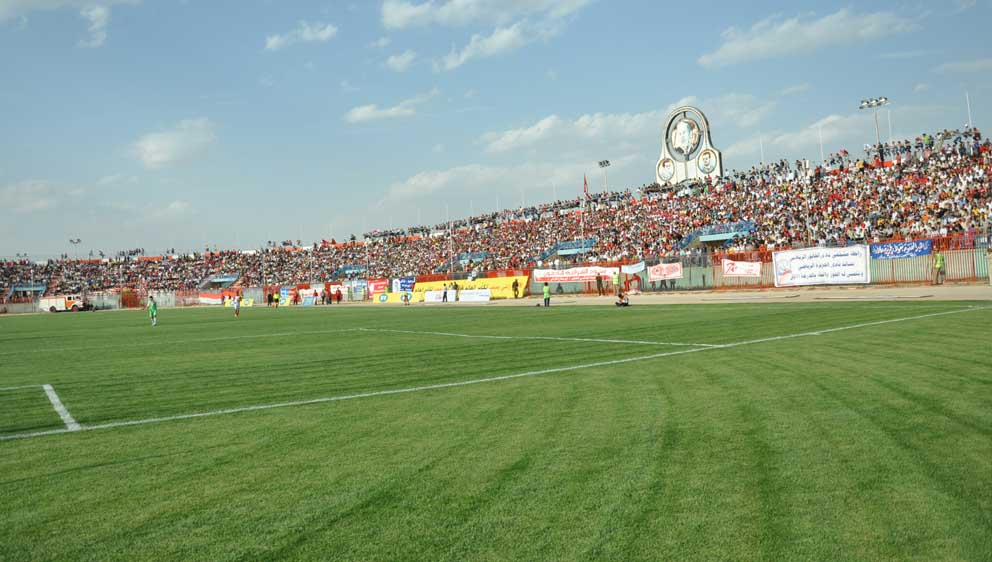
Al-Hasakah Municipal Stadium

Al-Jazeera SC is the largest football club in the city and plays at Al-Hasakah Municipal Stadium.

== Gallery ==
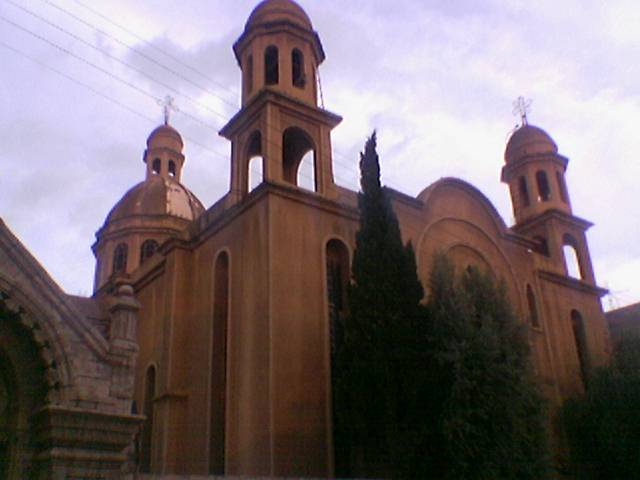
Saint George Syriac Orthodox Cathedral

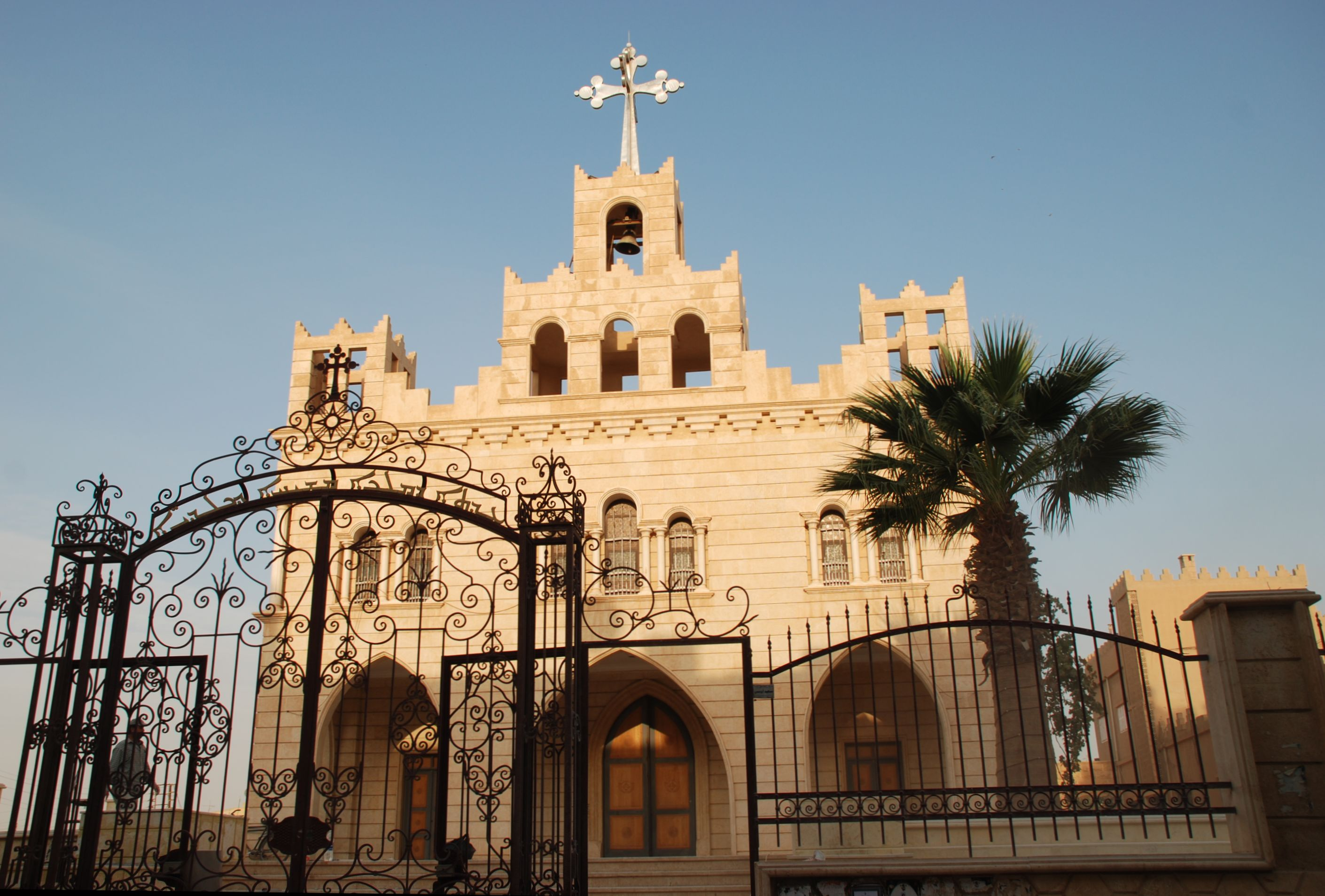
Chaldean Catholic Church

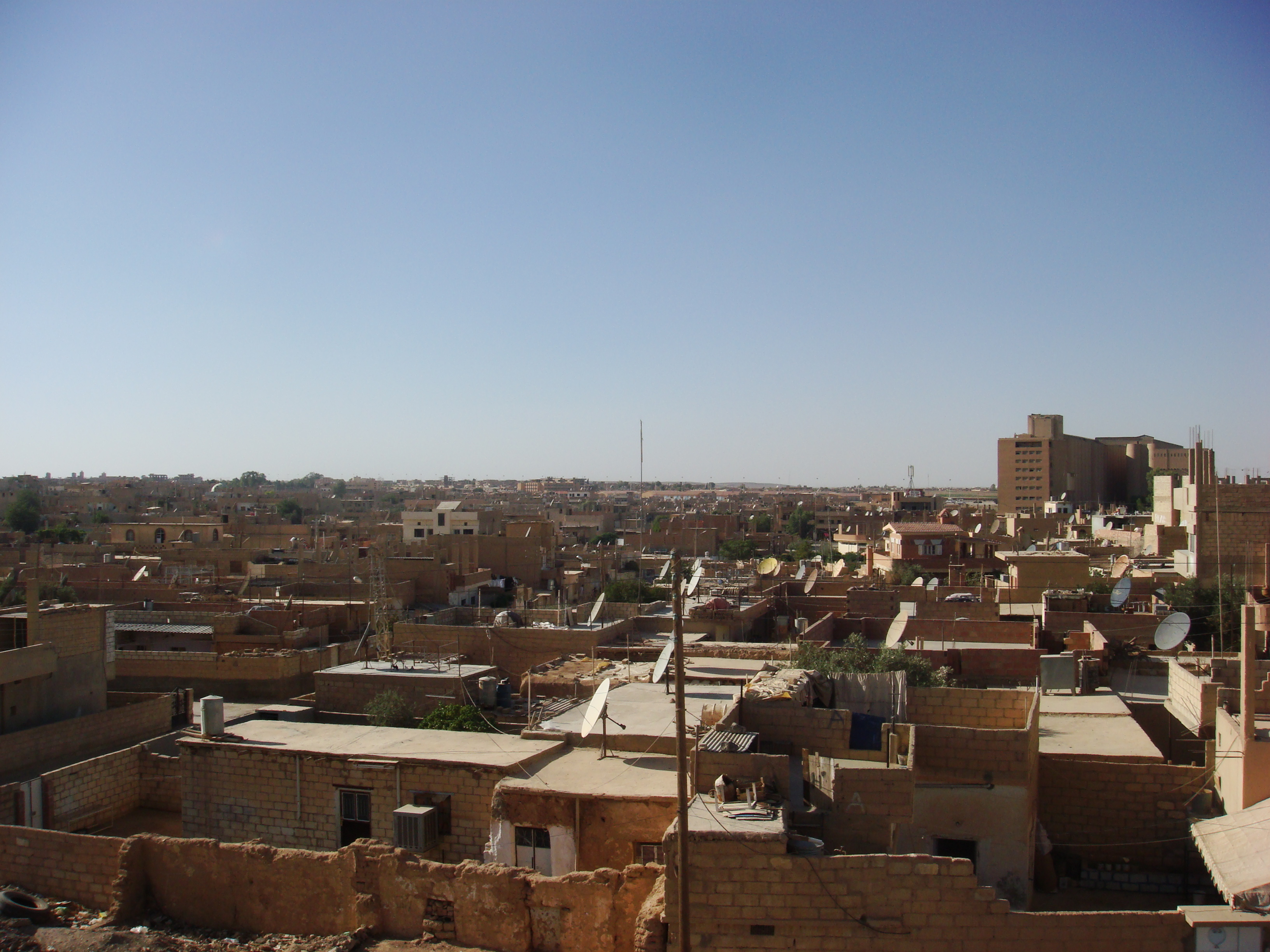
Tell Hajjar neighborhood

== Notable people ==
- Hammouda Sabbagh, politician
- Ignatius Joseph III Yonan, the Syriac Catholic Patriarch of Antioch
- Said Gabari, Kurdish musician

== See also ==
- Syriac Catholic Archeparchy of Hasakah-Nisibis

== Works cited ==
- Vanly, Ismet Chériff (1992). "The Kurds in Syria and Lebanon". In Philip G. Kreyenbroek; Stefan Sperl (eds.). The Kurds: A Contemporary Overview. New York City, London: Routledge. p. 116. ISBN 978-0-415-96691-7.
