= 2003 United States–British–Spanish Draft Resolution on Iraq =

United Nations draft resolution

The 2003 United States–British–Spanish Draft Resolution on Iraq was, according to Ambassador John Negroponte, "a resolution to have the Council decide that Iraq is not complying, is out of compliance, with Resolution 1441". Initially introduced on February 24, 2003, and amended on March 7, 2003, the draft set a March 17 deadline for Iraq to demonstrate "full, unconditional, immediate and active cooperation in accordance with its disarmament obligations." The draft was based on information from the Iraqi defector "Curveball," who claimed Saddam Hussein was in possession of weapons of mass destruction, which Curveball later admitted was untrue. The widely discussed UN resolution was not brought up for formal vote after it became clear that it would not have passed due to opposition from France, Russia, and China. The United States invaded Iraq without UN support on March 20, 2003, initiating the Iraq War.

== Background ==
=== Timeline ===
==== 2001 ====
- September 11: 19 militants of the Islamic extremist group al-Qaeda hijacked four planes in the United States and carried out suicide attacks. Two of the hijacked planes were flown into the Twin Towers of the World Trade Center in New York City, a third plane hit the Pentagon just outside Washington, D.C., and the fourth plane crashed in a field in Pennsylvania. Almost 3,000 people were killed during the 9/11 attacks.
- November 21: According to Bob Woodward in Plan of Attack, US president George W. Bush said to the Secretary of Defense, Donald Rumsfeld: "Let’s get started on this."

==== 2002 ====
- April 6: British Prime Minister Tony Blair visited President Bush where they discussed getting rid of Saddam Hussein.
- September 12: In a speech to the United Nations (UN), President Bush said world leaders must get tough with Iraq or stand aside as the United States acts.
- September 16: The Iraqi government announced weapons inspectors were welcome to return unconditionally after nearly four years.
- September 24: Britain published a report claiming Iraq could produce a nuclear weapon within one or two years if it obtains fissile material and other necessary materials.
- November 8: The UN Security Council unanimously approved a US-drafted resolution aimed at getting Saddam Hussein to disarm his country. The resolution said Saddam will face "serious consequences" if he did not comply with weapons inspectors.
- November 13: Iraq accepted the UN resolution, while denying that it had any banned weapons programs.
- November 18: First UN weapons inspectors arrived in Baghdad.
- December 7: Iraq handed a 12,000-page declaration of its arms programs to UN inspectors.
- December 18: The British government said the first assessment of Iraq's weapons declaration showed it was not the "full and complete declaration" requested by the security council.
- December 19: The chief UN weapons inspector, Hans Blix, said gaps remained in Iraq's declaration, but that they continued to cooperate with UN inspectors. Then US ambassador John Negroponte said the omissions meant Iraq was in "material breach" of the resolution and had "spurned its last opportunity to comply with its disarmament obligations."

==== 2003 ====
- January 9: Blix announced that his team had been unable to locate a “smoking gun” in Iraq but added that Baghdad failed to sufficiently answer questions in regards to their weapons program.
- President Bush, in a discussion and photo opportunity with Polish President Aleksander Kwaśniewski, remarked: “Time is running out on Saddam Hussein. He must disarm. I'm sick and tired of games and deception.”
- January 16: 12 empty chemical warheads were found by UN inspectors in Iraq.
- January 20: Iraq promised to help inspectors search from any remaining banned weapons.
- January 27: Dr. Blix and weapons inspector Mohamed ElBaradei, report to the UN that "Iraq appears not to have come to a genuine acceptance, not even today, of the disarmament which was demanded of it."
- January 28: Britain declared Iraq to be in “material breach" of UN disarmament agreement.
- January 31: President Bush and Prime Minister Blair met at the White House to discuss a new UN resolution to authorize military force against Iraq.
- February 5: Colin Powell addressed the UN to present evidence of Iraq's ongoing weapons program, saying that “the facts and Iraq's behavior show that Saddam Hussein and his regime are concealing their efforts to produce more weapons of mass destruction."
- February 14: In his address to the Security Council, Blix admitted that his team had not found any weapons of mass destruction as of yet. French Foreign Minister Dominique de Villepin reminded the Council that there is no justification for war yet, and that the weapons inspections were still producing results.
- February 23: Blair made an address to the House of Commons, denying that the US and Britain were rushing towards a war. “We are now 12 years after Saddam was first told by the UN to disarm; nearly six months after President Bush made his speech to the UN accepting the UN route to disarmament; nearly four months on from Resolution 1441; and even now today we are offering Saddam the prospect of voluntary disarmament through the UN."
- February 24:
  - Washington, D.C., London, and Madrid introduce a draft resolution that declared that Iraq wasted its final opportunity to disarm
  - A French counter proposal, backed by Germany and Russia, called for more UN weapons inspections.
- February 27: The Security Council opened discussion of US-British-Spanish draft resolution that laid the groundwork for war in Iraq.
- March 1: Iraq disposed of four al-Samoud 2 missiles in time for UN deadline, as agreed to the previous day.
- March 5: Foreign ministers of France, Russia, and German released a joint declaration that they would not allow any resolution that authorizes military action.
- March 7:
  - Blix reported to the Security Council that the process of disarmament had been steady, but Baghdad was not transparent in questions regarding their chemical and biological weapons programs.
  - The US, Britain, and Spain present a revised version of the February 27 resolution that states Saddam had until March 17 to disarm, or face a movement towards war.
- March 14: In a phone call, French President Jacques Chirac, confirmed to Prime Minister Blair that France was willing to compromise on a draft resolution to disarm Saddam, but would not accept any resolution that set an ultimatum for war.
- March 17:
  - The joint resolution between the US, Britain and Spain was abandoned.
  - President Bush gave Saddam and his sons 48 hours to leave the country. “Their refusal to do so will result in military conflict, commenced at a time of our choosing. For their own safety, all foreign nationals -- including journalists and inspectors -- should leave Iraq immediately."
- March 19: Invasion of Iraq, the first stage of the Iraq War began.

=== The Bush Administration ===
Critics of the war in Iraq argued that the Bush Administration had ulterior motives for the UN resolution. Some argue the Bush administration sought to protect American economic interests and used the investigation and eventual invasion of Iraq to preserve control over massive oil preserves. In 2003 about twenty-five percent of world oil production in 2003 came from Iraq. Saddam Hussein controlled about 60% of the world's known oil reserves. The United States economy relies on oil and is the world's largest net importer of oil. An invasion meant the Bush administration would gain control of Iraqi oil fields and potentially decrease the price of oil in other OPEC countries. The UN resolution gave the US greater control of what was happening in the country. Any invasion for failing to cooperate with the resolution gave the Bush administration direct control over the country's resources and thus increasing their power in the middle east. Inspecting Iranian weapons also gave the United States a greater presence in the middle east and allowed for the monitoring of extremism in Iran and Saudi Arabia.

== Draft Resolution ==
=== Summary of Draft Resolution ===
While the draft consisted of no hard deadlines or explicit threats of military intervention, it states that Saddam Hussein, president of Iraq, has failed to comply with previous UN resolutions. The draft also warned of “serious consequences” if Iraq continued to pursue weapons of mass destruction. The draft was largely in response to Iraq's refusal to follow Resolution 1441. In the ninth point the draft proposes that the council “recognise[es] the threat of Iraq’s non-compliance with Council resolutions” The amendment to the draft on March 7 gives Iraq a deadline, stating that if Iraq refuses to comply with Resolution 1441 by March 17, that there will be further actions taken against Iraq.

== Responses and Public Opinion ==
=== Opposition within United Nations ===
France, Germany, and Russia were the leaders in the opposition to the draft resolution, and were very vocal in representing the disapproval of the resolution amongst members of the UN Security Council. On March 5, the foreign ministers of France (Dominique de Villepin), Germany (Joschka Fischer), and Russia (Igor Ivanov) held a mini-summit in Paris where they discussed their opposition to the resolution. There was no representative of China at the meeting, but Ivanov announced that China agreed with the three countries in opposition to the resolution. After the meeting, de Villepen spoke at a press conference, saying, “We will not allow a resolution to pass that authorises resorting to force...Russia and France, as permanent members of the security council, will assume their full responsibilities on this point.” de Villepen noted that Iraq should cooperate better with the inspectors, but all three agreed that they had seen progress from Iraq in disarmament and use of force against Iraq would not be the right decision.

=== Iraqi Response ===
Protests in Iraq sprung up shortly after the inception of the war and occasionally caused violent exchanges with the United States military. On April 28, 2003, United States soldiers fired on Iraqi protesters in Baghdad. 13 people were killed and 75 wounded. Two days later, U.S. soldiers fired on a group protesting earlier shootings in Falluja.

=== Media and Public Opinion ===
The impact of 9/11 and the nationalizing sentiment that came with it was a heavy influence on the support of American-initiated invasion and in public support for the president. In a poll published in October 2002, days after President George W. Bush issued a public address on the possibility of invasion, surveyors broke down 10 findings on public opinion. The survey showed that at around this time a majority were still in support of invasion but this support was arguably waning. Support was divided along party lines, with a majority of Republicans in support and a majority of Democrats opposed. President Bush was pushing the message that the United States had attempted all diplomatic methods and was left with no other choice, but only around 46% of the public bought into that narrative, with 49% wanting to see more diplomatic efforts before an invasion took place. Further requisites for stronger public support included an assurance that casualties would be minimized and that the U.N. backed the invasion, which the public later observed was not the case.

In the months leading up to the Iraq War and the abandoning of the resolution, anti-war protests and rhetoric gained momentum. On February 15, 2003, protests emerged in around 650 cities globally with estimates of somewhere between 6 and 11 million participants in the largest standing global protest to ever take place. Opinions in response to the decision to go to war remained polarized, but most Americans express their preference for a diplomatic solution over the invasion. In polls conducted by major media outlets, the justifications by Iraq war supporters were broken down. More Americans, in a 2-1 ratio, supported the idea of invasion if it was on the principle of removing Saddam Hussein from power, and 60% of those with this view were ready to see this invasion take place within weeks. This view was expressed shortly before the draft was suspended and the invasion actually occurred. Public opinion on the war before the invasion also heavily hinged on the UN's response to the United States–British–Spanish Draft Resolution on Iraq. As of March 16, 2003, a day before the abandonment of the resolution, those who were previously in support of invasion would drop to 54% if the UN Security Council rejected the resolution for military action. That number dropped even lower, to 47%, if President Bush would not seek a final Security Council vote before taking military action. Anti-war sentiment was somewhat pervasive among civilians before the war and correlated to one's placement on the political spectrum, but was increasingly more dominant across party lines in the later years when it became clear that the war progressed long past its expected timeline and the more people believed the costs were outweighing the benefits.

== Aftermath ==
=== Withdrawal of Draft Resolution ===
On March 17, the revised draft resolution was withdrawn by the United Kingdom's Ambassador to the United Nations, Jeremy Greenstock. He spoke on behalf of the United Kingdom, United States, and Spain, and ended his statement by saying, “Given this situation, the co-sponsors have agreed that we will not pursue a vote on the UK/US/Spanish resolution in blue...The co-sponsors reserve their right to take their own steps to secure the disarmament of Iraq.” On the same day, United Nations Secretary General Kofi Annan announced the decision to pull United Nations employees out of Iraq. The 156 inspectors and employees of the International Atomic Energy Agency, as well as the United Nations Monitoring, Verification and Inspection Commission (UNMOVIC), were seen leaving their headquarters in Baghdad.

=== Beginning of Iraq War ===
==== Bush’s Ultimatum ====
On the evening of March 17, President Bush gave an address on live television explaining the current threat of Iraq's weapons, and saying, “America tried to work with the United Nations to address this threat because we wanted to resolve the issue peacefully. We believe in the mission of the United Nations...the United States and our allies are authorized to use force in ridding Iraq of weapons of mass destruction. This is not a question of authority, this is a question of will.” Expressing his disappointment in the disagreement within the Security Council, he said, “The United Nations Security Council has not lived up to its responsibilities, so we will rise to ours.” President Bush then issued an ultimatum to Saddam Hussein, giving him and his sons 48 hours to leave Iraq. If they chose not to comply, the country would face military action. President Bush also advised Americans working in Iraq to leave the country as soon as possible. He promised to aid Iraqis if the United States did go to war with the country's government, and announced further security measures that were being undertaken by the states and coast.

==== Invasion of Iraq ====
The United States moved forward without the support of the United Nations on March 19, 2003. President Bush followed through on his ultimatum to Saddam Hussein and ordered the United States Army to invade Iraq without a declaration of war under the codename “Operation Iraqi Freedom”, signaling the 2003 invasion of Iraq. President Bush gave an address to the United States within an hour of the first attacks on Baghdad, and warned the country that the fight ahead may be, “could be longer and more difficult than some predict.” The operations continued for about a month and a half, On May 1, President Bush gave his Mission Accomplished speech, in which he announced, “Major combat operations in Iraq have ended. In the Battle of Iraq, the United States and our allies have prevailed. And now our coalition is engaged in securing and reconstructing that country.” with a banner reading “Mission Accomplished” visible behind him. However, this United States military involvement did not formally end until December 15, 2011, when United States held a ceremony to mark the full withdrawal of United States troops from Iraq.

==== United Nations Reaction and Role in Iraq War ====
The Iraq War began on March 19, 2003, when the United States and United Kingdom launched a bombing campaign. The war commenced two days after the United States, United Kingdom, and Spain abandoned their joint resolution in the United Nations (UN). Since the UN Security Council refused to endorse the joint resolution and US-UK invasion and occupation in March 2003, the US and UK hoped to ignore the UN and operate without restriction in Iraq. However, Iraqi resistance, economic and political problems, and international criticism forced the US and UK to seek international partners, including assistance from the UN. Controversy ensued as some thought the UN could be the wedge for internationalization and would force US-UK withdrawal, while others thought a UN presence in the war would discredit the UN. Two months after the war, the UN Security Council adopted Security Council Resolution 1483, and UN Security General Kofi Annan appointed a Special Representative for Iraq and the UN assumed small responsibilities in Iraq.

The U.N. Special Representative to Iraq became Vieira de Mello. The main tasks of the representative were to work with U.S. authorities to create a representative government in Iraq, coordinate humanitarian relief, aid reconstruction of Iraq's infrastructure, boost the protection of human rights, and encourage international cooperation to aid the country.

In August 2003, there was a massive bombing of the UN Headquarters in Baghdad which confirmed critics fears. The UN then withdrew from Iraq until February 2004, when under heavy US pressure the UN agreed to send a mission to Iraq to help construct a new government.

=== Curveball ===
Much of the United States’ justification for starting the war was the claim that the Iraqi government was hiding a biological weapon mobile laboratory program. This came from an informant known as “Curveball”, who has since admitted made up the story because he saw an opportunity to topple Saddam Hussein's regime. Curveball was first discovered to be an unreliable source in 2005, and admitted to his false statements in February 2011, revealing himself to be Rafid Ahmed Alwan al-Janabi, an Iraqi defector living in Germany. He stated, “I had a problem with the Saddam regime. I wanted to get rid of him and now I had this chance...Believe me, there was no other way to bring about freedom in Iraq. There were no other possibilities." Janabi stated to the Guardian that he is proud in his part in taking down Saddam. In 2007, Colin Powell told reporters that he had no idea that Curveball's information was at all untrustworthy. Leaders in intelligence, including former deputy director of National Intelligence, Thomas Fingar, have made clear that the decision to trust Curveball was a mistake.
