= Al-Nashwa =

Al-Nashwa النشوة
- District
- Country: Syria
- City: Al-Hasakah

Population (2004 census)
  - Total: 25,340

Al-Nashwa (Arabic: النشوة), is a district of Al-Hasakah, Syria.
