= Said Gabari =

Syrian Kurdish singer, musician and composer

Said Gabari Seîd Gabarî
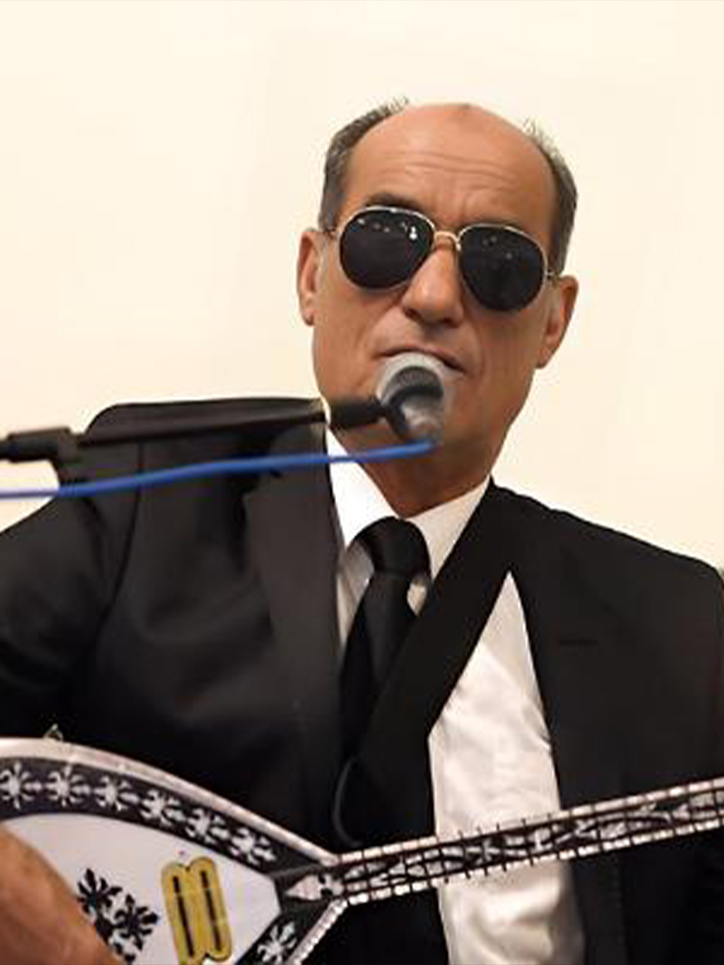
- Said Gabari

Background information
- Born: 13 April 1956; Xirbê Kejê, Hasakah Governorate, Syria
- Died: 4 May 2020 (aged 64) Erbil, Kurdistan Region, Iraq
- Genres: Kurdish, folk, patriotic, revolutionary
- Occupations: Singer, musician, composer
- Instrument: Tembûr
- Years active: 1969–2020

Said Gabari (Kurdish: Seîd Gabarî; 13 April 1956 – 4 May 2020) was a Syrian Kurdish singer, musician and composer. He was known for performing Kurdish folk, patriotic and revolutionary songs and for setting poems by Kurdish poets such as Cigerxwîn and Seydayê Tîrêj to music. His career spanned more than five decades and was closely associated with Kurdish music and the preservation of Kurdish cultural heritage.

== Early life ==
Said Gabari was born on 13 April 1956 in the village of Xirbê Kejê in the Hasakah Governorate of northeastern Syria.

According to Welat TV, Gabari's musical talent became apparent when he was about eight years old. His mother, who sang Kurdish folk songs, influenced his early interest in music, and the two memorised traditional songs together. He later met the Kurdish poets Cigerxwîn and Seydayê Tîrêj, who supported his artistic development and whose poems he subsequently performed and set to music.

In 1967, according to a later Welat TV account, Gabari taught himself to play the tembûr. He gave his first concert in 1969 and recorded his first song that same year, which was subsequently distributed widely.

== Musical career and political repression ==
Gabari's repertoire included Kurdish folk songs as well as patriotic and revolutionary songs. His work was closely connected with Kurdish cultural and political themes. Welat TV reported that he performed national, folk and popular songs in Qamishli and Amuda during the early years of his career.

In 1970, Gabari was arrested during a concert in Qamishli for singing revolutionary songs. According to accounts by Kurdistan24 and Welat TV, he was tortured following his arrest. He continued to perform Kurdish songs despite political repression.

Kurdistan24 reported that Gabari spent years in prisons in different parts of the Kurdish region. In a 2015 interview with The Christian Science Monitor, he was described as a "Peshmerga bard" and spoke about his experiences of imprisonment and his musical activities.

Gabari was also involved with the Peshmerga. Later accounts by Welat TV describe him as participating in the May Revolution and working with Peshmerga media, as well as taking part in political and educational activities.

During his life, Gabari lived in Syria, the Kurdistan Region of Iraq, Iran and Germany. He later settled in the Kurdistan Region.

== Musical works ==
One of Gabari's best-known songs was "Ey Bilbilê Dilşadî", based on a poem by Seydayê Tîrêj. Welat TV described the song as one of his most recognised works.

Gabari's music has also been preserved in digital music catalogues. Apple Music lists the album Êşa Gel, released in 1995 by Ses Media. The album contains ten tracks.

== Albums ==
- Êşa Gel, Ses Media, 1995.

=== Êşa Gel ===
The album Êşa Gel contains ten songs and was released in 1995 by Ses Media.

1. Dersim
2. Dîlber
3. Gel Namire
4. Du Şivana
5. Derdê Gelê Min Dijwar E
6. Disa Gelê Min Êşîya
7. Torîn
8. Li Yarê Ra
9. Payîzok
10. Lo Li Pismamo

The track listing is documented by Spotify and Apple Music. Spotify lists Êşa Gel as a 1995 album by Said Gabari and identifies all ten tracks.

Among the album's better-known songs are Dîlber, Gel Namire, Derdê Gelê Min Dijwar E, Du Şivana, Torîn, Li Yarê Ra, Payîzok and Lo Li Pismamo.

== Death ==
In March 2020, Gabari travelled from Germany to the Kurdistan Region of Iraq. After completing a period of quarantine during the COVID-19 pandemic, his health deteriorated and he was admitted to a hospital in Erbil.

Gabari died on 4 May 2020 at a hospital in Erbil, aged 64, after suffering from lung cancer. He was buried at the Mala Omar cemetery near Erbil.

== Legacy ==
Gabari is remembered in Kurdish media as an important singer and cultural figure from Syrian Kurdistan. His work contributed to the preservation and dissemination of Kurdish folk music and Kurdish-language songs. Welat TV described his career as spanning more than five decades and highlighted his role in preserving Kurdish folklore and history.

== See also ==
- Cigerxwîn
- Seydayê Tîrêj
- Mihemed Şêxo
- Kurdish music
- Peshmerga
