= Al-Nasra =

Al-Nasra الناصرة
- District
- Country: Syria
- City: Al-Hasakah

Population (2004 census)
  - Total: 42,070

Al-Nasra (Arabic: الناصرة), is a district of Al-Hasakah, Syria.
