= Al-Aziziyah =

- District
- Country: Syria
- City: Al-Hasakah

Population (2004 census)
  - Total: 56,123

Al-Aziziyah (Arabic: العزيزية), is a district of Al-Hasakah, Syria.
