= Outline of the Iraq War =

Overview and topical guide

The following outline is provided as an overview of, and topical guide to, the Iraq War.

The Iraq War was a protracted armed conflict in Iraq lasting from 2003 to 2011, which began with the invasion of Iraq by a United States-led coalition that overthrew the Iraqi government of Saddam Hussein. The conflict continued for much of the next decade as an insurgency emerged to oppose the coalition forces and the post-invasion Iraqi government. US troops were officially withdrawn in 2011. The invasion occurred as part of the George W. Bush administration's war on terror following the September 11 attacks.

== Overview of articles ==
=== Top level overview articles ===
Changes in territorial control during the 2003 invasion of Iraq

- Iraq War
- 2003 invasion of Iraq

=== Major overview subdivisions ===
- Prelude to the Iraq War
- Rationale for the Iraq War
- Occupation of Iraq (2003–2011)
  - American occupation of Ramadi
- Iraqi insurgency (2003–2011)
- Anbar campaign (2003–2011)
- Fallujah during the Iraq War
- Execution of Saddam Hussein (2006)
- Iraqi civil war (2006–2008)
- Iraq War troop surge of 2007
- Withdrawal of United States troops from Iraq (2007–2011)

=== Timelines ===
- Timeline of the Iraq War
  - Timeline of the 2003 invasion of Iraq
  - Timeline of the Iraq War troop surge of 2007
- Iraq disarmament timeline 1990–2003
- Timeline of Saddam Hussein and al-Qaeda link allegations
- Timeline of the Plame affair

=== Years in Iraq ===
2003, 2004, 2005, 2006, 2007, 2008, 2009, 2010, 2011

== Background to the Iraq War ==
=== Historical background ===
- Cold War
- Iraqi–Kurdish conflict
- British foreign policy in the Middle East
  - Iraq–United Kingdom relations
- United States foreign policy in the Middle East
  - Iraq–United States relations

==== Before 1990 ====
- 14 July Revolution
- Ramadan Revolution
- 17 July Revolution
- Iranian Revolution
- 1979 Ba'ath Party Purge
- Iran–Iraq War
  - United States support for Iraq during the Iran–Iraq War
  - British support for Iraq during the Iran–Iraq War
    - Arms-to-Iraq affair (Scott Report)
  - Iraqi chemical attacks against Iran
  - Anfal campaign
  - Iran–Contra affair

==== 1990–2001 ====
- Gulf War (1990–1991)
  - Iraqi invasion of Kuwait
  - Nayirah testimony
- International sanctions against Iraq (1990–2003)
- Iraqi uprisings (1991)
- Iraqi no-fly zones conflict (1991–2003)
  - Operation Provide Comfort
- United Nations Special Commission regarding Iraq's use of weapons of mass destruction (1991–1998)
- Oil-for-Food Programme (1995–2003)
  - Oil-for-Food Program Hearings (2004–2005)
- Iraq Liberation Act (1998)
- 1998 bombing of Iraq
- September 11 attacks (2001)
  - Motives for the September 11 attacks
  - Aftermath of the September 11 attacks
    - Authorization for Use of Military Force of 2001
    - Patriot Act
- War on terror
- 2001 anthrax attacks
- War in Afghanistan (2001–2021)
  - United States invasion of Afghanistan (2001)

== Participants of the Iraq War ==
=== Multi-National Force – Iraq ===
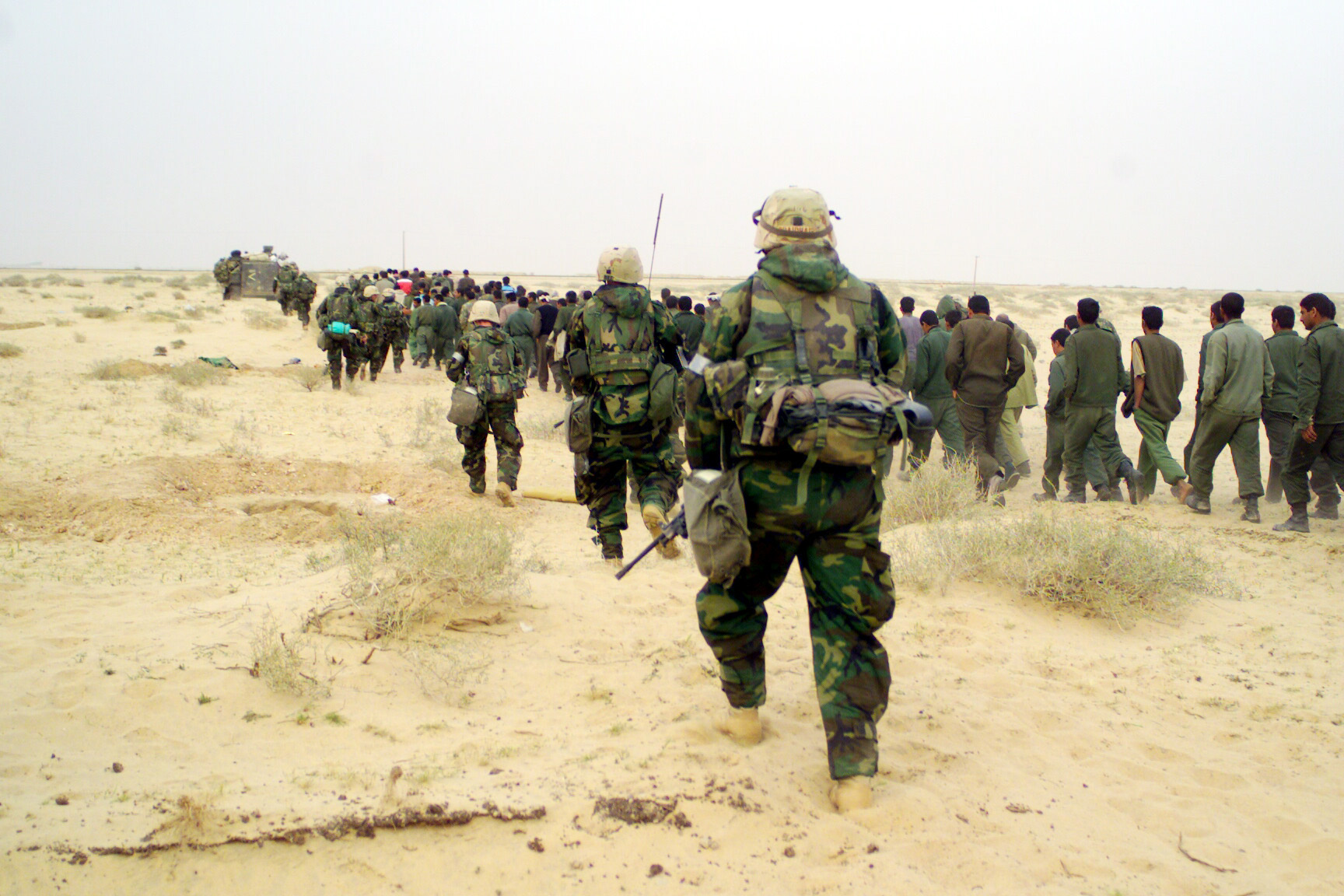
United States Marines escorting Iraqi prisoners of war to a holding area in the desert, 21 March 2003.

- Balad Air Base
- Multi-National Division – Baghdad
- Multinational Division Central-South
- Multi-National Division (South-East)
- Multi-National Force West
- Multi-National Security Transition Command – Iraq

==== March 2003 invasion forces ====
- United States
  - Foreign policy of the George W. Bush administration
- United Kingdom (until May 2011)
- Australia (until July 2009)
  - Al Muthanna Task Group
- Poland (until October 2008)
  - Polish zone in Iraq

==== Other contributors ====
- Denmark (April 2003–2008)
- South Korea (May 2003–2008)
- Italy (July 2003–2006)
- Plus Ultra Brigade (July 2003–2004) (Note: Spain, Dominican Republic, El Salvador, Honduras, and Nicaragua)
- Georgia (August 2003–2008)
- Ukraine (August 2003–2008)
- Thailand (September 2003–2004)
- Japan (2004–2006)

=== Iraq ===
- Ba'athist Iraq (until April 2003)
- Coalition Provisional Authority (2003–2004)
- Republic of Iraq (Note: See § Governments of Iraq for more details)

=== Insurgent groups ===
==== Ba'athist insurgents ====
- Fedayeen Saddam
- Al-Awda (guerrilla organization)
- Popular Army (Iraq)
- Al-Abud Network
- Army of the Men of the Naqshbandi Order
- Supreme Command for Jihad and Liberation

==== Sunni insurgents ====
- Islamic Army in Iraq
- 1920 Revolution Brigades
- Jaish al-Rashideen
- Islamic Front for the Iraqi Resistance
- Hamas of Iraq
- Jaysh Muhammad al-Fatih
- Mujahideen Shura Council (Iraq)
- Islamic State of Iraq
  - Al-Qaeda in Iraq
  - Jaish al-Ta'ifa al-Mansurah
- Jama'at al-Tawhid wal-Jihad
- Jamaat Ansar al-Sunna
- Ansar al-Islam in Kurdistan
- Black Banner Organization
- Wakefulness and Holy War
- Abu Theeb's group
- Salafi Army of Abu Bakr Al-Siddiq
- Mujahideen Army (Iraq)
- Jamaat Jaysh Ahl al-Sunnah wa-l-Jamaah

==== Shi'a insurgents ====
- Special Groups (Iraq)
- Mahdi Army
- Abu Deraa's militia
- Badr Organization
- Islamic Supreme Council of Iraq
- Sheibani Network
- Soldiers of Heaven
- Asa'ib Ahl al-Haq
- Promised Day Brigade
- Kata'ib Hezbollah

=== Private militaries ===
- Private militias in Iraq
- Private military company § Iraq
  - Aegis Defence Services
  - Asgaard – German Security Group
  - Blackwater (company)
  - Custer Battles
  - DynCorp
  - KBR, Inc.
  - Unity Resources Group

=== Others ===
- Canada
- Iran

== Prelude ==
- Failed Iraqi peace initiatives
- United Nations Security Council Resolution 1441
- 2003 United States–British–Spanish Draft Resolution on Iraq

=== Rationale for invasion ===
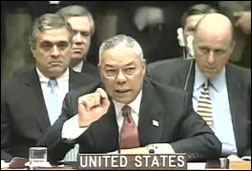
US Secretary of State Colin Powell, holding up a model vial of alleged weaponized anthrax during a February 2003 presentation at the United Nations.

- Colin Powell's presentation to the United Nations Security Council
- Human rights in Ba'athist Iraq
- Iraq and weapons of mass destruction
  - Allegations of Iraqi mobile weapons laboratories
    - Curveball (informant)
  - Iraq disarmament crisis
  - Iraqi aluminum tubes
  - Iraqi biological weapons program
  - Niger uranium forgeries
- Iraq War and the war on terror
  - Mohamed Atta's alleged Prague connection
  - Saddam Hussein and al-Qaeda link allegations
  - Wood Green ricin plot

== Media and communications of the Iraq War ==
- Al Jazeera bombing memo
- Dover test
- February 2003 Saddam Hussein interview
- International figures' positions on the 2003 invasion of Iraq
- International reactions to the prelude to the Iraq War
- Media coverage of the Iraq War
- Oprah's Anti-war series

=== Documents ===
Articles are sorted chronologically.

- Habbush letter
- Downing Street memo
- Torture Memos
- September Dossier
- Land letter
- Vilnius letter
- The letter of the eight
- Bush–Blair 2003 Iraq memo
- Iraq Dossier (or February Dossier)
- Bush–Aznar memo
- 2004 Iraq document leak
- Iraq War documents leak

=== Public relations, propaganda and disinformation ===
- 2003 State of the Union Address
- AFN Iraq (Freedom Radio)
- Azores Summit
- Committee for the Liberation of Iraq
- Embedded journalism
- Free speech zone
- Hearts and minds (Iraq)
- Mission Accomplished speech
- Office of Special Plans
- Operation Mass Appeal
- Pentagon military analyst program
- Pentagon rapid response operation
- Saddam Hussein's alleged shredder
- White House Iraq Group
- WMD conjecture after the 2003 invasion of Iraq

=== Slogans, symbols and neologisms ===
- Axis of evil
- "Baghdad Bob"
- "Chemical Ali"
- Coalition of the willing
- Freedom fries
- Friedman Unit
- Global arrogance
- Inverted totalitarianism
- Iraqi map pendant
- Khuy Voyne!
- Make Love Fuck War
- "Mrs. Anthrax"
- Old Europe and New Europe
- Photo Op (photomontage)
- Smoking gun / mushroom cloud
- Shock and awe
- Star Spangled Ice Cream
- "There are unknown unknowns"

== Battles of the Iraq War ==
All battles are sorted in chronological order.

=== Invasion phase (2003) ===
- Battle of Umm Qasr
- Battle of Al Faw (2003)
- Battle of Basra (2003)
- Battle of Nasiriyah
- 2003 attack on Karbala
- Battle of Haditha Dam
- Battle of Najaf (2003)
- Battle of Samawah
- Battle of Karbala (2003)
- Battle of Kut (2003)
- Battle of Hillah (2003)
- Battle of the Karbala Gap (2003)
- Battle of Debecka Pass
- Battle of Baghdad (2003)

=== First insurgency phase (2003–2006) ===
==== 2003 battles ====
- Battle of Majar al-Kabir
- Ramadan Offensive (2003)

==== 2004 battles ====
- 2004 Fallujah ambush
- Defense of the Karbala City Hall
- First Battle of Fallujah
- Siege of Sadr City
- Battle of Ramadi (2004)
- 2004 Good Friday ambush
- Battle of Baghdad International Airport
- Battle of Husaybah (2004)
- Battle of Danny Boy
- Battle of Najaf (2004)
- Battle of the CIMIC House
- Battle of Samarra (2004)
- Second Battle of Fallujah
- Battle of Mosul (2004)

==== 2005 battles ====
- Lake Tharthar raid
- Battle of Abu Ghraib
- Battle of Al-Qa'im (2005)
- 2005 Hit convoy ambush
- Battle of Haditha
- Battle of Tal Afar (2005)

=== Civil war (2006–2008) ===
==== 2006 battles ====
- Battle of Baghdad (2006–2008)
- Battle of Ramadi (2006)
- Second Battle of Habbaniyah
- Battle of Diwaniya
- Battle of Al Rumaythah
- Battle of Amarah
- Battle of Turki

==== 2007 battles ====
- Battle of Haifa Street
- Karbala provincial headquarters raid
- Battle of Najaf (2007)
- Operation Shurta Nasir
- Siege of Basra (2007)
- Battle of Baqubah
- Battle of Route Bismarck
- Battle of Donkey Island
- Battle of Karbala (2007)

==== 2008 battles ====
- 2008 Iraqi Day of Ashura fighting
- 2008 Nineveh campaign
- Battle of Basra (2008)
- 2008 al-Qaeda offensive in Iraq

=== Second insurgency phase (2008–2011) ===
- Operation Augurs of Prosperity
- 2008 Abu Kamal raid
- Battle of the Palm Grove

== Economics of the Iraq War ==
- Commander's Emergency Response Program (CERP)
- Development Fund for Iraq (DFI)
- Economic reform of Iraq
- Financial cost of the Iraq War
- Allegations of misappropriations related to the Iraq War
- Investment in post-invasion Iraq
- Special Inspector General for Iraq Reconstruction (SIGIR)
- Task Force Shield

== Human rights and war crimes in the Iraq War ==
- Human rights in post-invasion Iraq
- Humanitarian crises of the Iraq War

=== Casualties ===
- Casualties of the Iraq War
  - List of private contractor deaths in Iraq

==== Estimates of Iraqi casualties ====
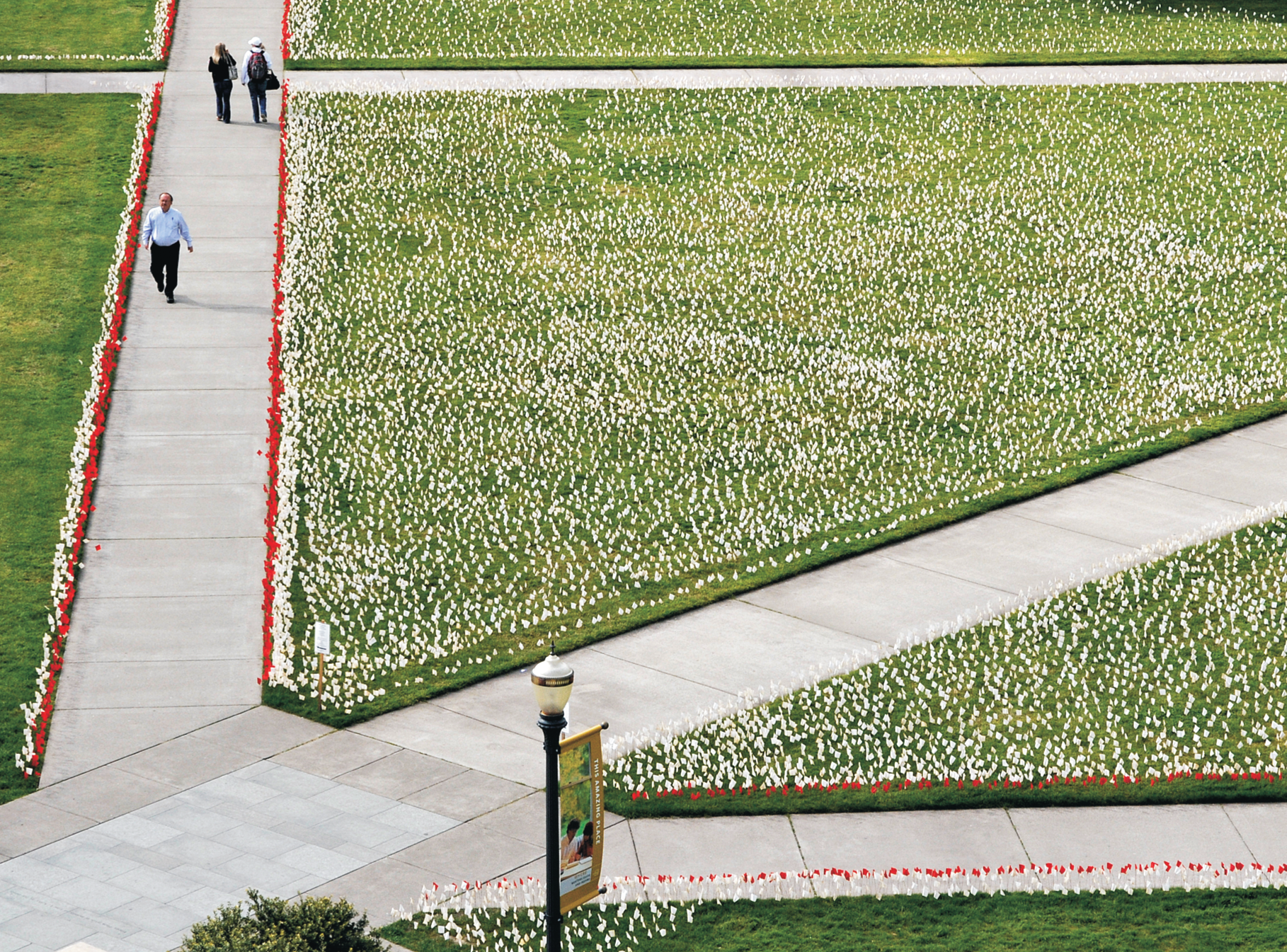
White and red flags, representing Iraqi and American deaths respectively, sit in the grass quadrangle of The Valley Library on the campus of Oregon State University. (May 2008)

- Iraq Family Health Survey (2008)
- Lancet surveys of Iraq War casualties (2004, 2006)
- Iraq Body Count project (2003–2011)
- ORB survey of Iraq War casualties (2007, 2008)

=== Chemical weapons ===
- Chlorine bombings in Iraq
- White phosphorus munitions § Use by US forces in Iraq

=== Disease ===
- 2007 Iraq cholera outbreak

=== Ethnic and religious attacks ===
Attacks are sorted in chronological order.

==== 2003 attacks ====
- Jordanian embassy bombing in Baghdad
- Canal Hotel bombing
- 2003 Imam Ali Shrine bombing
- 27 October 2003 Baghdad bombings

==== 2004 attacks ====
- 2004 Erbil bombings
- 2004 Ashura massacre
- 2004 Basra police station bombings
- 2004 Mosul bombings
- 2004 church bombings in Baghdad and Mosul
- 2004 Karbala and Najaf bombings
- 2004 Kufa mosque bombing

==== 2005 attacks ====
- 2005 Al Hillah bombing
- 2005 Erbil bombing
- 2005 Musayyib bombing
- Baghdad bombings
  - August
  - September
- 2005 Balad bombings
- 2005 Khanaqin bombings

==== 2006 attacks ====
- 2006 Karbala–Ramadi bombings
- 2006 al-Askari mosque bombing
- Buratha mosque bombing
- Sadr City bombings
  - July
  - November
- Hayy Al-Jihad massacre

==== 2007 attacks ====
- Mustansiriya University bombings
- Baghdad bombings
  - 22 January
  - 3 February
  - 12 February
  - 18 February
  - 29 March
  - 18 April
  - 26 July
  - 1 August
- 2007 Al Hillah bombings
- 2007 Tal Afar bombings and massacre
- 2007 Iraqi Parliament bombing
- 2007 Karbala mosque bombings
- Massacres of Yazidis
  - April 2007 Yazidi massacre
  - Qahtaniyah bombings
- 2007 Makhmour bombing
- Abu Sayda chlorine bombing
- 2007 al-Askari mosque bombing
- 2007 al-Khilani mosque bombing
- 2007 Amirli bombing
- 2007 Kirkuk bombings
- 2007 Al Amarah bombings

==== 2008 attacks ====
- Bagdad bombings
  - February
  - March
  - June
- 2008 Balad bombing
- 2008 Karbala bombing
- 2008 Karmah bombing
- 2008 Dujail bombing
- 2008 Balad Ruz bombing
- 2008 attacks on Christians in Mosul
- Abdullah restaurant bombing

==== 2009 attacks ====
- Bagdad bombings
  - March
  - 6 April
  - June
  - August
  - October
  - December
- April 2009 Baghdad–Miqdadiyah suicide attacks
- 2009 Taza bombing
- 2009 Kirkuk bombing
- 2009 Tal Afar bombing

==== 2010 attacks ====
- Bagdad bombings
  - January
  - February
  - April
  - August
  - September
  - November
- Nationwide attacks
  - 10 May
  - 25 August
- 2010 Baqubah bombings
- 2010 Baghdad church siege

==== 2011 attacks ====
- Bagdad bombings
  - August
  - October
- 2011 Tikrit assault
- 2011 Al Hillah bombing
- 2011 Samarra bombing
- 2011 Al Diwaniyah bombing
- 2011 Taji bombings
- 2011 Karbala bombing
- 2011 Basra bombings
- Nationwide attacks
  - January
  - August

=== Hostages and kidnapping ===
- Foreign hostages in Iraq
- Hostage Working Group

==== Hostage-taking and kidnapping by insurgents ====
- June 2006 abduction of United States soldiers in Iraq
- May 2007 abduction of United States soldiers in Iraq
- Abduction of Russian diplomats in Iraq
- Christian Peacemaker hostage crisis
- Kidnapping of Angelo dela Cruz
- Nepal hostage crisis

==== Hostage-taking and kidnapping by coalition forces ====
- Kidnapping of Jalal Sharafi
- United States raid on the Iranian Liaison Office in Erbil

=== Prisons and torture ===
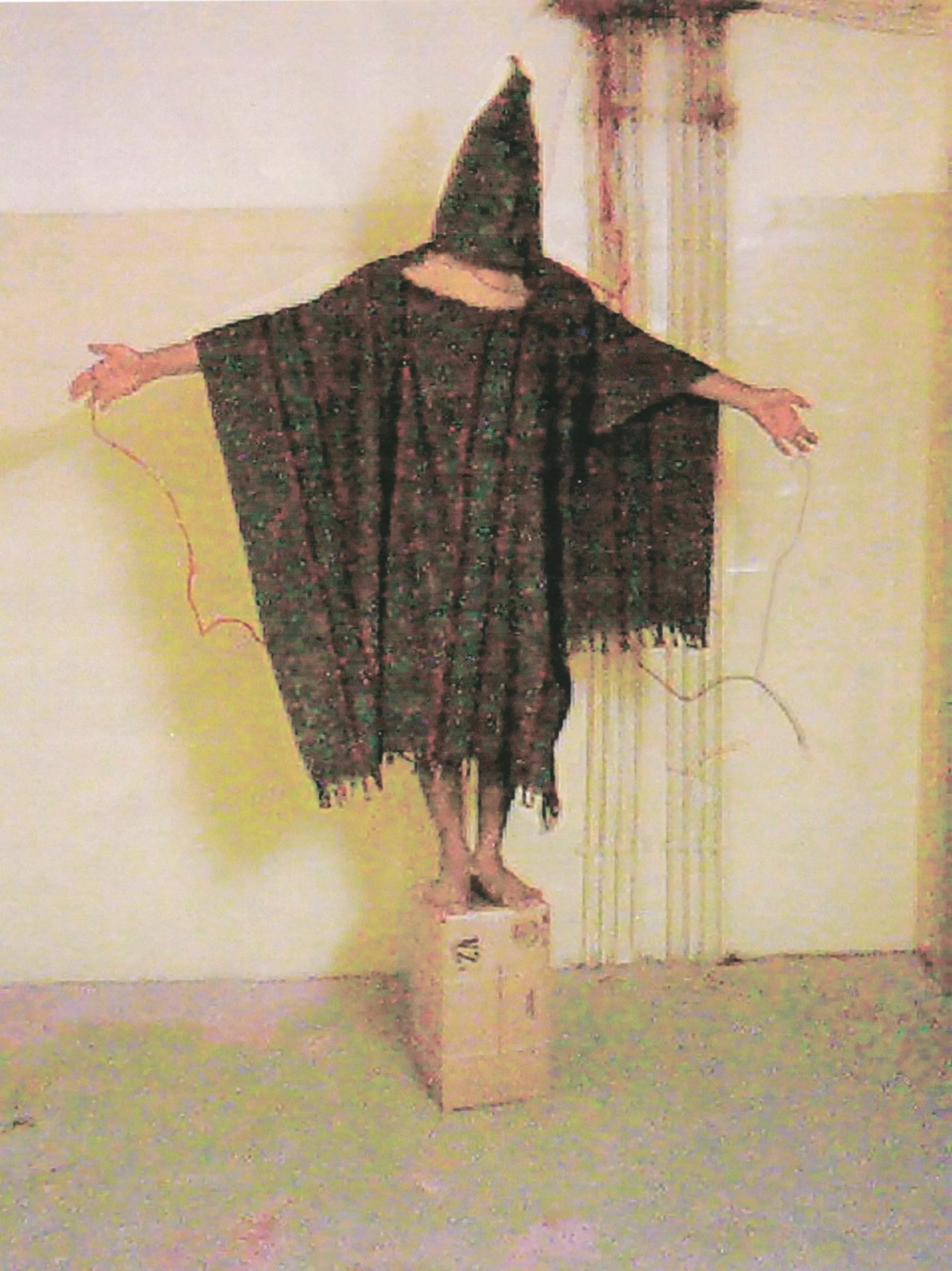
Infamous photo of Abdou Hussain Saad Faleh being tortured at Abu Ghraib prison, standing on a box with wires attached to his hands.

- Iraq prison abuse scandals
  - Abu Ghraib torture and prisoner abuse
  - Camp Bucca
  - Camp Cropper
  - Camp Nama
- Invasion of Iraq prisoner escapes
- Iraq War prisoners of war (category)
  - United States prisoners of war in the 2003 invasion of Iraq
- United States prison operations in the Iraq War
  - Ghost detainees
- Wolf Brigade (Iraq)

==== Torture methods ====
- Copper Green
- Enhanced interrogation techniques
- Five techniques

=== Refugees and internal displacement ===
- Internally displaced persons in Iraq
- Refugees of Iraq
  - Assyrian exodus from Iraq
  - Diavata refugee camp
  - Iraqi Refugee Camp, West Azerbaijan
- List Project

=== Targeted violence ===
- Sectarian violence in Iraq
- Violence against academics in post-invasion Iraq
- 2003 Palestinian exodus from Iraq

=== War crimes by U.S.-led coalition forces ===
War crimes are listed in roughly chronological order.

- War crimes during the 2003 invasion
  - April 2003 journalist killings by the United States
  - Fallujah killings of April 2003
- Abu Ghraib torture and prisoner abuse (2003–2006)
  - Killing of Manadel al-Jamadi (2003)
- Death of Nadhem Abdullah (2003)
- Death of Nagem Hatab (2003)
- Killing of Baha Mousa (2003)
- Death of Abed Hamed Mowhoush (2003)
- Killing of Muhamad Husain Kadir (2004)
- Death of Fashad Mohamed (2004)
- Mukaradeeb wedding party massacre (2004)
- Haifa Street helicopter incident (2005)
- January 2005 Tal Afar shootings
- Basra prison incident (2005)
- Haditha massacre (2005)
- Mahmudiyah rape and killings (2006)
- Ishaqi massacre (2006)
- Hamdania incident (2006)
- Operation Iron Triangle (2006)
- July 12, 2007, Baghdad airstrike
- Nisour Square massacre (2007)

==== War crimes by the Iraqi Army ====
- 2011 raid on Camp Ashraf

=== Other human rights topics ===
- Archaeological looting in Iraq
- Damage to Baghdad during the Iraq War
- United States kill or capture strategy in Iraq

== Law and the Iraq War ==
- Legality of the Iraq War
- Iraqi sovereignty during the Iraq War

=== Case law ===
==== UK case law ====
- Secretary of State for Foreign and Commonwealth Affairs v Rahmatullah

==== US case law ====
- Doe v. Bush
- Abtan v. Blackwater
- Rumsfeld v. Padilla
- Saleh v. Bush
- United States v. Libby

=== Commissions, inquiries and reports ===
- Al-Sweady Inquiry
- Butler Review
- Church Report on detainee interrogation
- Graham/Talent WMD Commission
- Commission on Wartime Contracting in Iraq and Afghanistan
- Fay Report
- Hutton Inquiry
- Iraq Inquiry
- Iraq Study Group Report
- Iraq Intelligence Commission
- Iraq Historic Allegations Team
- Report to Congress on the Situation in Iraq
- Ryder Report (Detention and Corrections in Iraq)
- Senate Report on Iraqi WMD Intelligence
- Taguba Report

==== Unofficial commissions ====
- Kuala Lumpur War Crimes Commission

=== Courts-martial ===
- United States v. Hasan K. Akbar
- United States v. Manning

=== International law ===
- International Criminal Court and the 2003 invasion of Iraq
- United States and the International Criminal Court
  - American Non-Governmental Organizations Coalition for the International Criminal Court
- United Nations Assistance Mission for Iraq (UNAMI)

=== Resolutions, agreements and legislation ===
- Accountability and Justice Act (Iraq)
- American Service-Members' Protection Act (Hague Invasion Act)
- Authorization for Use of Military Force Against Iraq (US, 2002)
  - Repeal of the 2002 AUMF
- British parliamentary approval for the invasion of Iraq (UK)
- Iraq Oil Law
- Iraq War De-Escalation Act of 2007
- Military Action Against Iraq (Parliamentary Approval) Bill (1999)
- Military Commissions Act of 2006
- U.S.–Iraq Status of Forces Agreement

==== De-Ba'athification ====
- 100 Orders
  - Coalition Provisional Authority Order 1
  - Coalition Provisional Authority Order 2
  - Coalition Provisional Authority Order 17

==== United Nations Security Council resolutions (2003–2011) ====
- S/RES/1472 (March 2003)
- S/RES/1476 (April 2003)
- S/RES/1483 (May 2003)
- S/RES/1490 (July 2003)
- S/RES/1500 (August 2003)
- S/RES/1511 (October 2003)
- S/RES/1518 (November 2003)
- S/RES/1538 (April 2004)
- S/RES/1546 (June 2004)
- S/RES/1557 (12 August 2004)
- S/RES/1618 (4 August 2004)
- S/RES/1619 (August 2005)
- S/RES/1637 (November 2005)
- S/RES/1700 (August 2006)
- S/RES/1723 (November 2006)
- S/RES/1762 (June 2007)
- S/RES/1770 (August 2007)
- S/RES/1790 (December 2007)
- S/RES/1830 (August 2008)
- S/RES/1859 (December 2008)
- S/RES/1883 (August 2009)
- S/RES/1905 (December 2009)
- S/RES/1936 (August 2010)
- S/RES/1956 (15 December 2010)
- S/RES/1957 (15 December 2010)
- S/RES/1958 (15 December 2010)
- S/RES/2001 (July 2011)

=== Saddam Hussein ===
- Capture of Saddam Hussein (December 2003)
- Interrogation of Saddam Hussein (2003–2004)
- Trial of Saddam Hussein (2005–2006)
- Execution of Saddam Hussein (December 2006)
  - Reactions to the execution of Saddam Hussein

== Governments, elections and referendums of the Iraq War ==
=== Governments ===
==== Governments of Iraq ====
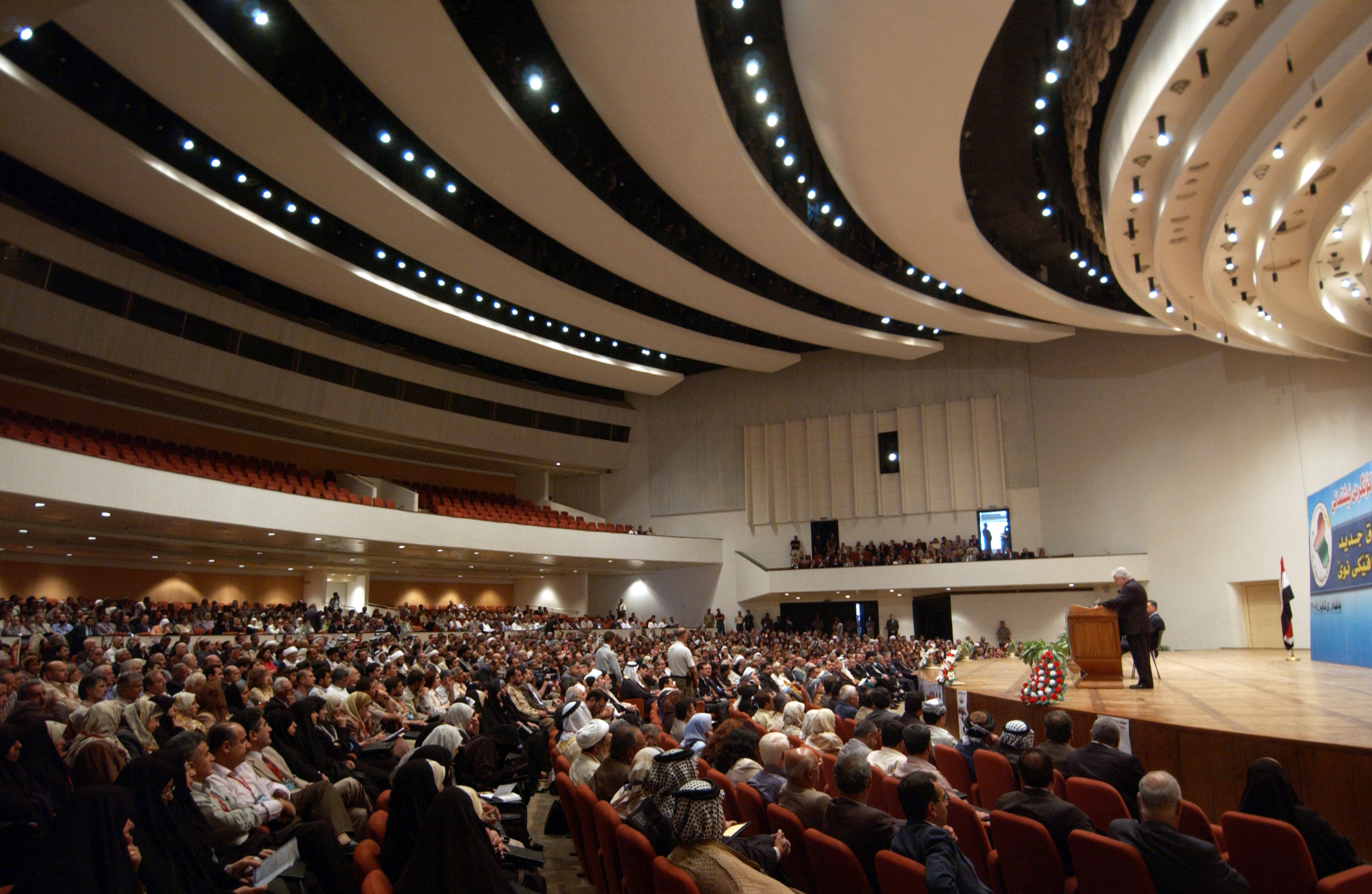
Parliament of Iraq holding a meeting in the Baghdad Convention Center, December 2008

- Revolutionary Command Council (1968–2003)
- Coalition Provisional Authority (2003–2004)
  - Iraqi Governing Council (2003–2004)
- Iraqi Interim Government (2004–2005)
- Iraqi Transitional Government (2005–2006)
- Federal government of Iraq (since 2006)
  - Governments of Nouri al-Maliki (2006–2010, 2010–2014)
    - 2006 Iraqi government formation
    - 2010 Iraqi government formation

==== Governments of the United Kingdom ====
- Premiership of Tony Blair (1997–2007)
- Premiership of Gordon Brown (2007–2010)
- Premiership of David Cameron (2010–2016)

==== Governments of the United States ====
- Presidency of George W. Bush (2001–2009)
- Presidency of Barack Obama (2009–2017)

=== Elections and referendums ===
==== In Iraq ====
- 2005 Iraqi governorate elections
- 2005 Iraqi constitutional referendum
  - Constitution of Iraq
- January 2005 Iraqi parliamentary election
- December 2005 Iraqi parliamentary election
- 2009 Iraqi governorate elections
- 2010 Iraqi parliamentary election

==== In the United Kingdom ====
- 2001 United Kingdom general election
- 2005 United Kingdom general election
- 2010 United Kingdom general election

==== In the United States ====
- 2000 United States presidential election
- 2004 United States presidential election
- 2008 United States presidential election

== Protests against the Iraq War ==
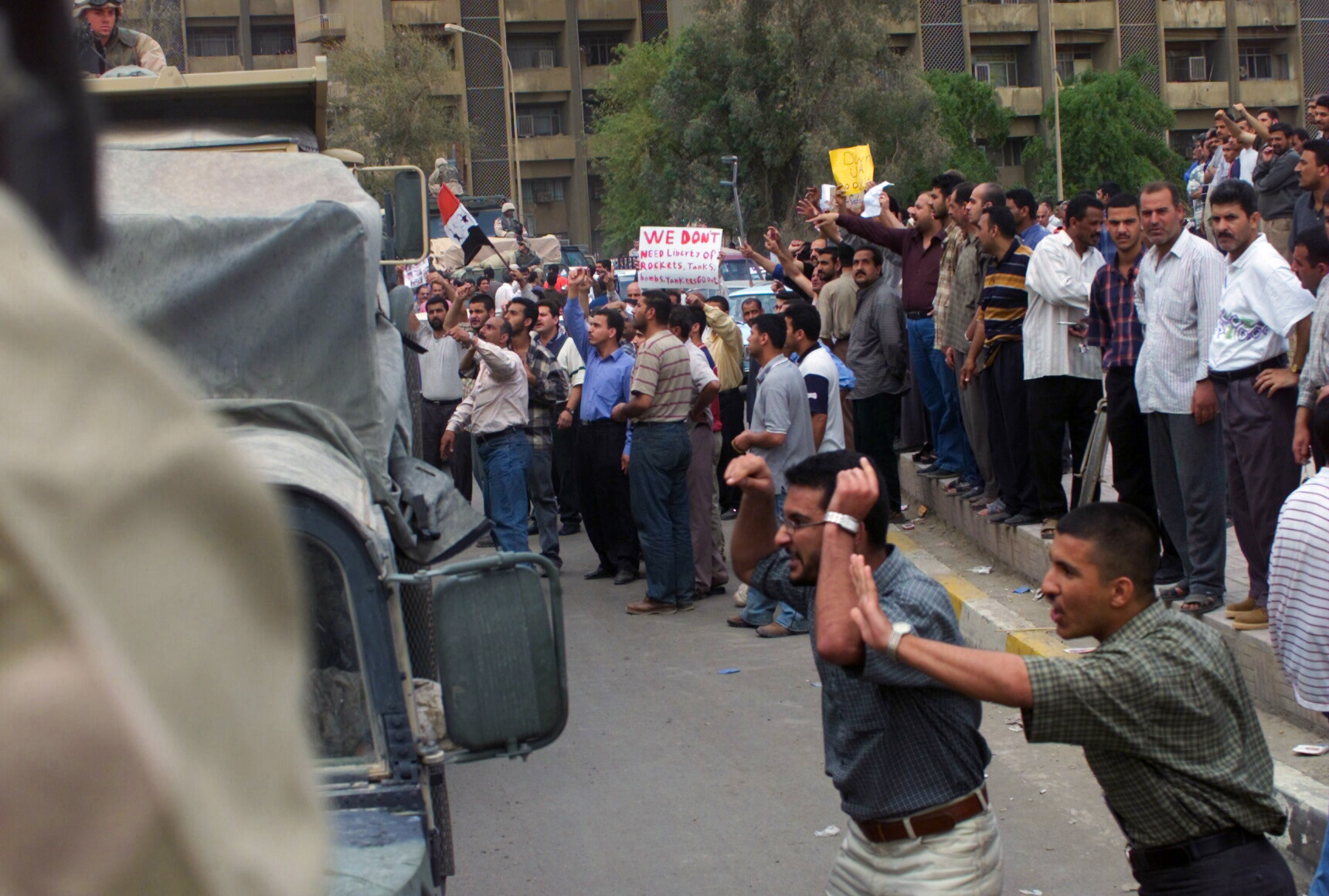
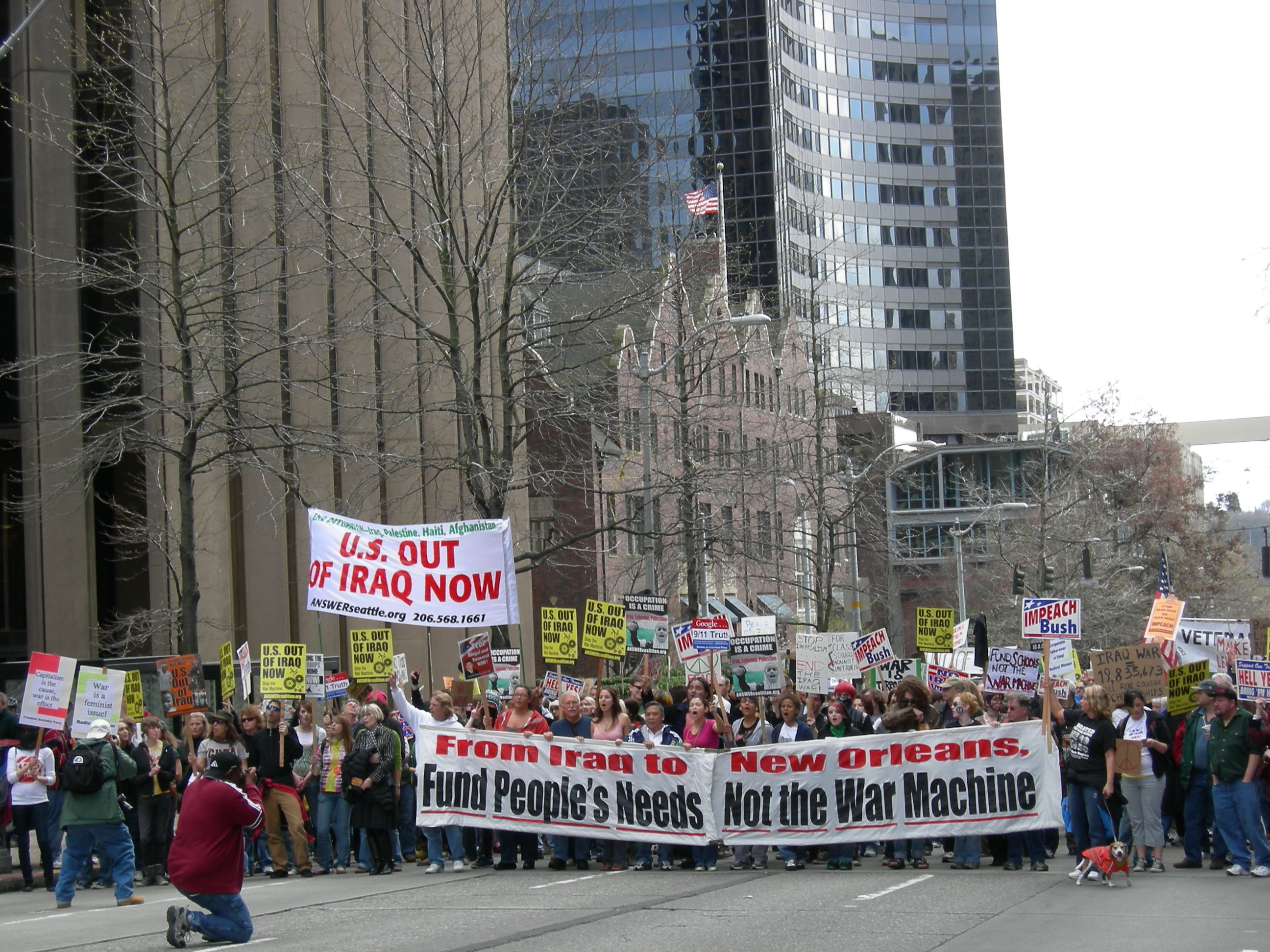
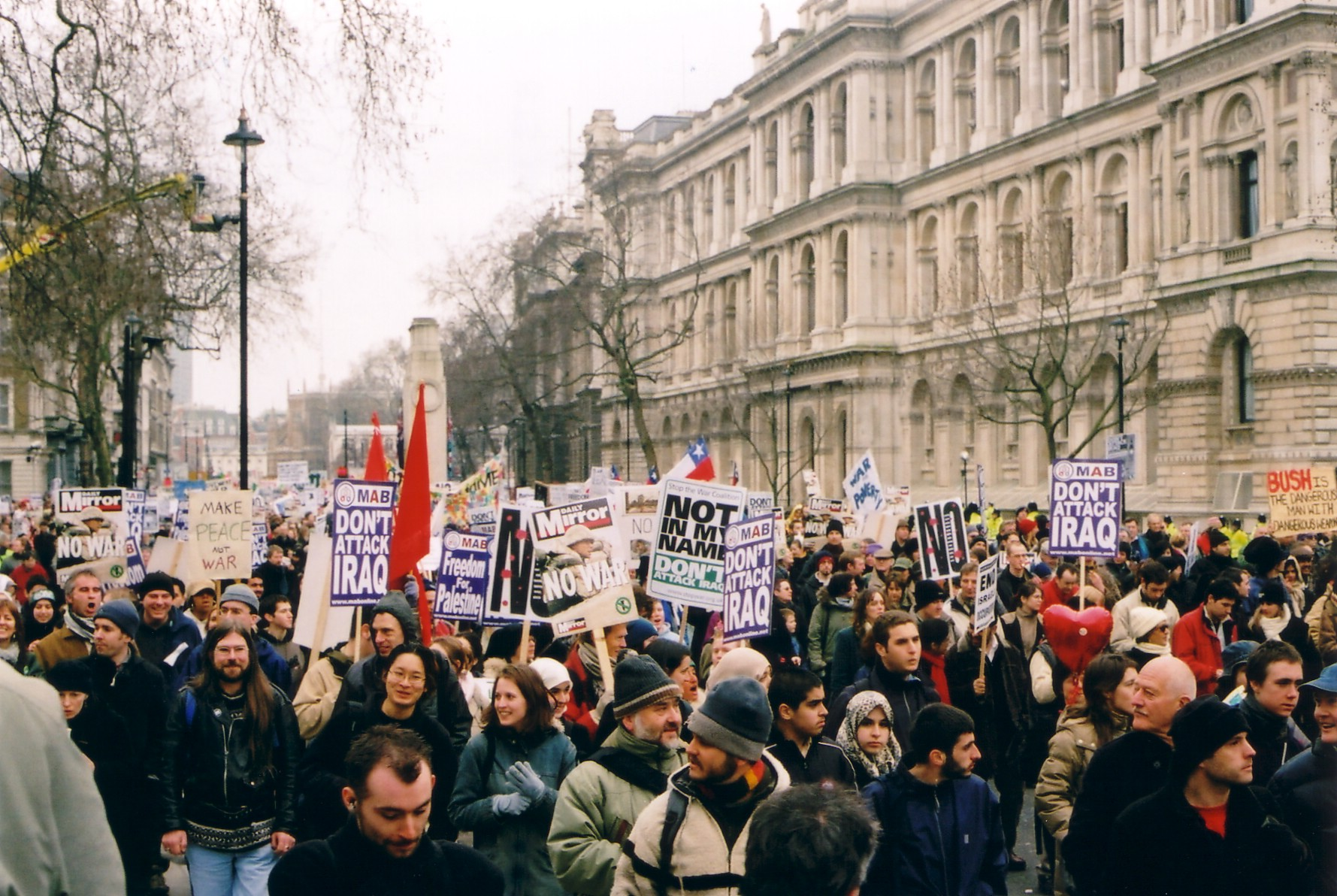
(1) Iraqi citizens protesting coalition forces in downtown Baghdad, April 2003; (2) anti-war protest in Seattle, USA, March 2007; (3) anti-war protest in Sheffield, UK, February 2005

Protests are sorted in chronological order.

- Turn Your Back on Bush, 2002; 2005
- Halloween 2002 anti-war protest
- 15 February 2003 Iraq War protests
- 20 March 2003 anti-war protest
- 2003 Port of Oakland dock protest
- Protests against the 2004 Istanbul NATO summit
- 2004 Republican National Convention protest activity
- Million Worker March, October 2004
- January 20, 2005, counter-inaugural protest
- Bring Them Home Now Tour, August–September 2005
- September 24, 2005, anti-war protest
- Protests at the 4th Summit of the Americas, November 2005
- Self-immolation of Malachi Ritscher, November 2006
- January 27, 2007, anti-war protest
- March 17, 2007, anti-war protest
- 2007 Port of Tacoma protests
- September 15, 2007, anti-war protest
- Berkeley Marine Corps Recruiting Center protests, 2007–2008
- Winter Soldier: Iraq & Afghanistan, March 13–16, 2008
- March 19, 2008, anti-war protest
- George W. Bush shoe-throwing incident, December 2008
- 2011 Iraqi protests

=== Anti-Iraq War groups ===
Groups are sorted in alphabetical order.

- 1984 Network Liberty Alliance
- About Face: Veterans Against the War
- A.N.S.W.E.R.
- Anti-War Coalition (South Africa)
- Anti-War Committee (Minnesota, USA)
- Antiwar (website)
- Appeal for Redress
- Campaign for Nuclear Disarmament
- Campaign for Peace and Democracy
- Campus Antiwar Network
- Central Committee for Conscientious Objectors
- Chicago Coalition Against War & Racism
- Code Pink
- Coffee Strong
- Community Peacemaker Teams
- Courage to Resist
- Crawford Texas Peace House
- Democracy Rising
- Diplomats and Military Commanders for Change
- Direct Action to Stop the War
- Food Not Bombs
- Friends of South Asia
- Global Peace and Justice Auckland
- Gold Star Families for Peace
- Human shield action to Iraq
- International Campaign Against Aggression on Iraq
- Iraq Peace Action Coalition
- Iraq Solidarity Campaign
- MoveOn
- National Campaign for Nonviolent Resistance
- National Network to End the War Against Iraq
- Not in Our Name
- Pitstop Ploughshares
- Pittsburgh Organizing Group
- Port Militarization Resistance
- Rock Against Bush
- Scotland Against Criminalising Communities
- September Eleventh Families for Peaceful Tomorrows
- Stop the War Coalition (UK)
- New Students for a Democratic Society
- Tent State University
- Theaters Against War
- Troops Out Now Coalition
- TrueMajority
- United for Peace and Justice
- Veterans for Common Sense
- Veteran Intelligence Professionals for Sanity
- War Resisters Support Campaign
- Win Without War
- The World Can't Wait

== Scandals and controversies of the Iraq War ==
Scandals and controversies are sorted in roughly chronological order.

=== American scandals and controversies ===
- Dixie Chicks comments on George W. Bush
- WMD conjecture after the 2003 invasion of Iraq
- Plame affair
- Iraq War resisters in Canada
- Al Qa'qaa high explosives controversy
- 2004 Iraq document leak
- 2004 Baghdad refusal of orders
- Scott Thomas Beauchamp controversy
- MoveOn.org ad controversy
- Bush Six

=== British scandals and controversies ===
- 190th Fighter Squadron, Blues and Royals friendly fire incident
- Death of David Kelly
- Al Jazeera bombing memo

=== Other scandals and controversies ===
- Iraq leak, Finland
- Hood event, Turkey

== Views on the Iraq War ==
- Criticism of the Iraq War
- International figures' positions on the 2003 invasion of Iraq
- International reactions to the prelude to the Iraq War
- Opposition to the Iraq War
- Protests against the Iraq War
- Public opinion in the United States on the invasion of Iraq
- United Nations Security Council and the Iraq War
- List of Iraq War resisters

== Aftermath of the Iraq War ==
=== Aftermath in Iraq ===
- Iraqi insurgency (2011–2013)
- War in Iraq (2013–2017)
- War against the Islamic State (2014–present)
- Operation Inherent Resolve in Iraq
- Iraqi insurgency (2017–present)

=== Memorials ===
- Afghan–Iraqi Freedom Memorial in Salem, Oregon, USA
- Al-Shaheed Monument in Baghdad, Iraq
- Arlington West and Arlington Southwest, USA
- Iraq and Afghanistan Memorial in London, England
- Lafayette hillside memorial, California, USA
- Northwood Gratitude and Honor Memorial in Irvine, California, USA
- Old North Memorial Garden in Boston, Massachusetts, USA
- Saving Iraqi Culture in Al-Mansour, Baghdad, Iraq

== Lists of the Iraq War ==
- List of assassinations during the Iraqi conflict
- List of aviation shootdowns and accidents during the Iraq War
- List of bombings during the Iraq War
- List of British casualties during the Iraq War
- List of British gallantry awards for the Iraq War
- List of British military installations used during the Iraq War
- List of charges in United States v. Manning
- List of coalition military operations of the Iraq War
- List of Iraq War documentaries
- List of private contractor deaths in Iraq
- List of United Nations Security Council resolutions concerning Iraq
- List of the United States military installations in Iraq
- Most-wanted Iraqi playing cards
- U.S. list of most-wanted Iraqis

== See also ==
- 2005 Al-Aimmah Bridge disaster
- American imperialism
- Anti-Ballistic Missile Treaty
- Blackwater (video game)
- Bush Doctrine
- Dead checking
- Efforts to impeach George W. Bush
- Eyes Wide Open (exhibit)
- Green Zone and Red Zone (Iraq)
- Guantanamo Bay detention camp
- The Iraq War: A Historiography of Wikipedia Changelogs
- Neoconservatism
- "Outposts of tyranny"
- Aftermath of the September 11 attacks
- A Responsible Plan to End the War in Iraq
- Six Days in Fallujah
- Strategic reset
- Triangle of Death (Iraq)
- United States militarism
- Wolfowitz Doctrine
- Yo, Blair
- Environmental impact of the Gulf wars

=== Contemporaneous conflicts in Iraq ===
- Iran–PJAK conflict (from 2004)
- Kurdistan Workers' Party insurgency
  - List of Turkish operations in northern Iraq
    - December 2007 Turkish incursion into northern Iraq
    - 2008 Turkish incursion into northern Iraq
    - August 2011 Turkey–Iraq cross-border raids
    - 2011 Hakkâri attack
