= Reactions to the execution of Saddam Hussein =

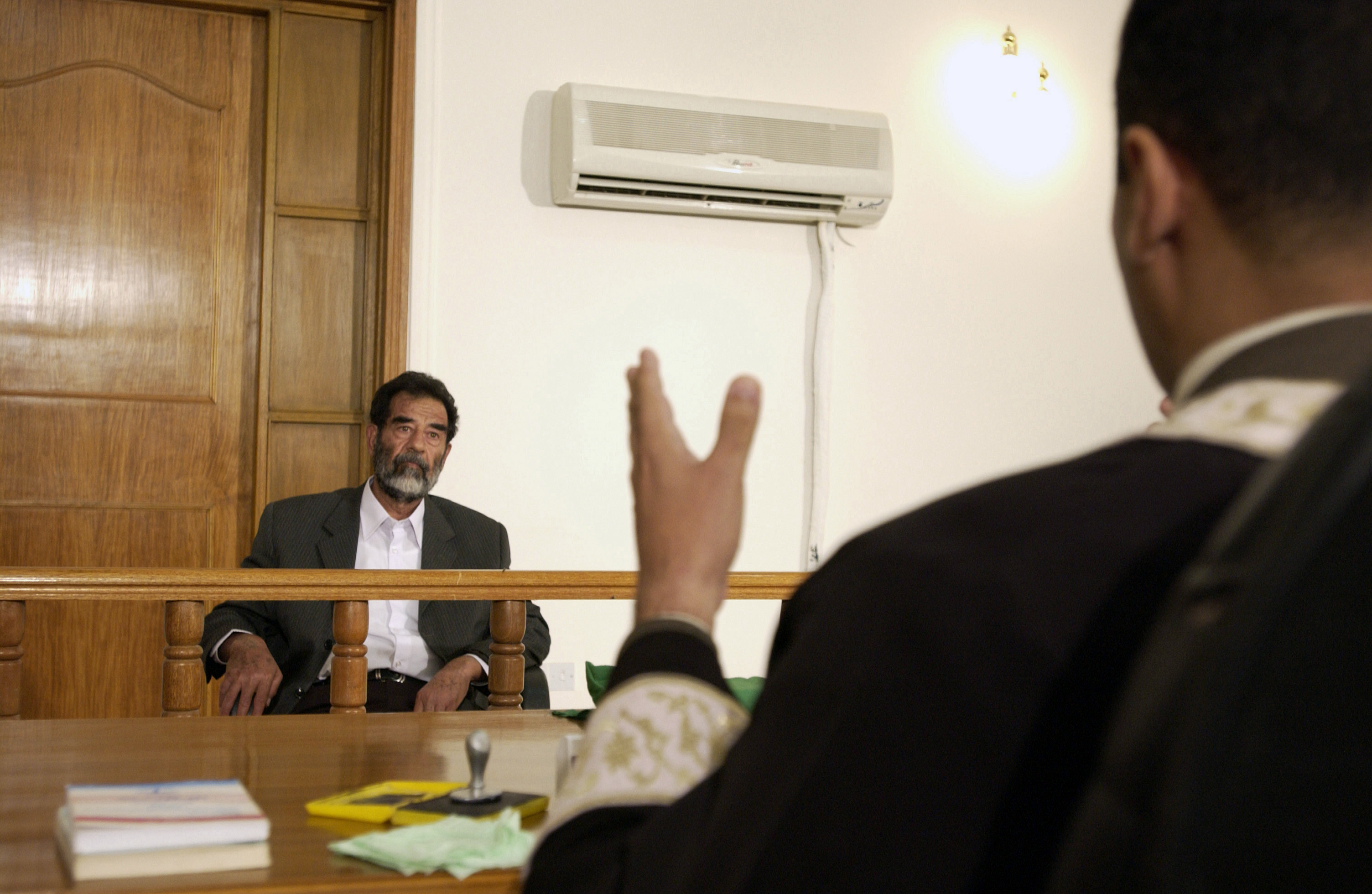
Saddam Hussein on trial in 2004

Reactions to the execution of Saddam Hussein were varied. Some strongly supported the execution, particularly those personally affected by Saddam's actions as leader. Some of these victims wished to see him brought to trial for his other actions, alleged to have resulted in a much greater number of deaths than those for which he was convicted. Some believed the execution would boost morale in Iraq, while others feared it would incite further violence. Many in the international community supported Saddam being brought to justice but objected in particular to the use of capital punishment. Saddam's supporters condemned the action as unjust.

"The world will know that Saddam Hussein lived honestly, died honestly, and maintained his principles. He did not lie when he declared his trial null", said Hussein's lawyers in a statement.

A spokeswoman for Saddam's daughters reported, "They felt very proud as they saw their father facing his executioners so bravely." In Amman, the capital of Jordan, Saddam's eldest daughter, Raghad, joined protests against her father's execution. Protesters expressed sentiment that Saddam was a martyr and that he was the only Arab leader to have opposed the United States.

According to reports from an official, people were dancing and sung Shi'a chants around Saddam's body after the execution took place. Two days after the execution, the Iraqi government launched an inquiry into the taunting and the way the execution was filmed.

George W. Bush, president of the United States at the time, stated that Saddam's death would not end the violence in Iraq. In Tikrit, Iraq, where Saddam was buried, police barred entrances to and departures from the city for four days as a safety precaution.

== Iraqi reaction ==
=== Politicians ===
In a statement, Prime Minister Nouri al-Maliki said, "Justice, in the name of the people, has carried out the death sentence against the criminal Saddam, who faced his fate like all tyrants, frightened and terrified during a hard day which he did not expect." He also stated, "Your generous and pure land has got rid—and for ever—of the filth of the dictator and a black page of Iraq's history has been turned and the tyrant has died." He also said that Saddam does not represent any group or sect of the Iraqi people.

"[Iraqis] have been waiting for justice to be executed, and I think that Iraqis have received the news that they've been waiting for, for too many years", said Iraqi Oil Minister Hussain al-Shahristani.

"The execution of Saddam Hussein is a big crime. Saddam Hussein was a prisoner of war and was arrested by the U.S. forces, and not by the Iraqi government. It is a crime with which they wanted to cover up many things", Sunni politician, Khalaf al-Ulayyan said.

"I don't think it will make much difference because the situation has deteriorated to such an extent that very drastic measures have to be taken to confront the militias and restore law and order", said Adnan Pachachi. "Of course, he has some supporters in Iraq—some of them are armed and they may commit acts of violence and so on—but I don't think it will make much difference, frankly."

The first chief judge who presided over Saddam Hussein's trial, Rizgar Mohammed Amin, said the execution was illegal, citing the beginning of the Eid al-Adha festival for Iraqi Sunnis, during which executions are banned, and Iraqi law that executions may only be carried out 30 days after the appeal court's decision on the sentencing. The appeals court's 26 December 2006 ruling stated that the sentence was to be carried out within 30 days.

The execution also prevented trials for other cases, including the chemical weapons attacks on Halabja in 1988. The Center of Halabja against Anfalization and Genocide of the Kurds (CHAK) disapproved of the execution, without having Saddam tried for other cases including the massacre of 8,000 Barzani Kurds in 1983, chemical attacks on Sardasht, the 1988 massacres on Anfal, and other crimes. At the time of his execution, Saddam was on trial, facing charges of genocide at Anfal, which resulted in an estimated 180,000 deaths. "Of course, Saddam has committed too many crimes. He deserves for those crimes capital punishment. But so quickly done, so quickly executed ... and only in one case—it would leave the other cases and leave a lot of secrets without being known", san Iraqi Kurdish politician, Mahmoud Osman said.

=== Populace ===
Shi'as in Iraq celebrated the execution while Sunni towns saw protests. In Sadr City, Basra, and Najaf, citizens danced in the streets and honked their car horns with jubilance. In Tikrit, Samarra, and Ramadi, however, there were reports of protests. David MacDougall, a Fox News reporter located in Baghdad, has stated that there has been what is thought to be celebratory gunfire in Baghdad. However, the BBC's correspondent in Baghdad, John Simpson, indicated there had been no more gunfire than is normally heard on the city's streets.

People in Iraq expressed mixed sentiments, with some glad to see the execution carried out. "Now, he is in the garbage of history", said Jawad Abdul-Aziz, a civilian who lost his father, three brothers, and 22 cousins because of Saddam. Ali Hamza, a professor in the Shi'a town of Al Diwaniyah said, "Now all the victims’ families will be happy because Saddam got his just sentence." Some were content to see Saddam gone, but expressed concerns about the instability in Iraq. Haider Hamed, a 34-year-old candy store owner in Baghdad and a Shi'a who lost his uncle due to Saddam, commented, "He's gone, but our problems continue. We brought problems on ourselves after Saddam because we began fighting Shi'a on Sunni and Sunni on Shi'a."

Other Iraqis expressed outrage and viewed Saddam as a martyr. "The president, the leader Saddam Hussein is a martyr and God will put him along with other martyrs. Do not be sad nor complain because he has died the death of a holy warrior", said Sheik Yahya al-Attawi, a cleric at a mosque. Protests occurred in Samarra, where Sunnis broke into the Al-Askari Mosque, and a riot broke out at Padush prison in Mosul.

== World reaction ==
At the time of Saddam's capture in December 2003, U.S. President George W. Bush expressed his opinion that Saddam deserved "the ultimate justice", alluding to the death penalty. This put the United States at odds with signatory countries to the European Convention on Human Rights (Article 2) and other international treaties that prohibit the death penalty and the extradition of suspects to countries where capital punishment may be carried out.

=== Opposition ===
Following the execution of Saddam, leaders from a handful of countries issued statements. Leaders of India, Cambodia, and Sri Lanka, as well as the presidents of Brazil, and Venezuela expressed opposition to the execution. Argentina's president Néstor Kirchner also condemned the execution, but also acknowledged Saddam's crimes during his tenure.

Leaders and governments of many European countries also expressed strong disapproval of using capital punishment in this and any case, including Austria, Denmark, Estonia, Finland, Germany, Italy, the Netherlands, Norway, Portugal, Spain, Sweden, Switzerland, and the United Kingdom. The European Commissioner for Development aid Louis Michel stated that the execution of Saddam was against the fundamental principles of the European Union (EU). The EU is against the death penalty, regardless of the crimes committed. "It is not a big day for democracy", Michel stated to the RTBF. "The EU is in fierce opposition to the death penalty and there is no exception to that fundamental principle. Cruelty is not to be answered with cruelty. I believe that there were other possible means to revenge the cruelties committed by Saddam. The death penalty is not the right answer." He feared that the execution of Saddam would have a negative impact and that the former president would emerge as a martyr. "You don't fight barbarism with acts that I deem as barbaric. The death penalty is not compatible with democracy", he told Reuters. Reverend Federico Lombardi, of the Vatican, expressed sadness and disapproval of the death penalty. Chile, Libya, Belgium, Russia, and Serbia expressed disapproval of capital punishment in this and any case, and also expressed concerns about implications of the execution on stability in Iraq.

Hosni Mubarak, the President of Egypt, called the execution shameful and unthinkable, and stated that the execution turned the ex-president into a martyr. "I am not saying whether Saddam did or did not deserve the death penalty. I am also not getting into the question of whether this court is lawful under occupation. I knew they wanted to administer the sentence before the end of the year, but why on the Muslim holiday? People are executed all over the world, but what happened in Baghdad on the first day of Eid al-Adha was unthinkable. I didn't believe it was happening", he said. "In the end, no one will ever forget the circumstances and the way in which Saddam was executed. They turned him into a martyr, and the problems in Iraq remained."

Muammar Gaddafi, leader of Libya said that "Saddam Hussein was a prisoner of war held by the US occupation forces, and as such should have been tried in the US or Britain, rather than in an Iraqi puppet regime's kangaroo court." Libya declared three days of mourning after Saddam's death and cancelled public celebrations around the Eid religious holiday.

Mahmoud Ahmadinejad, President of Iran said that "The execution of Saddam has proven that trusting the United States is not convenient," referring to the Iran–Iraq War in 1980–88 during which, he alleged, Washington encouraged Saddam in going to war with Tehran but then ousted him from power in 2003 "when he wasn't useful anymore. Countries in the region should learn the lesson and, like Iran, should only trust the will of their people and not corrupt powers."

Terry Davis, Secretary General of the Council of Europe, an international organization of which almost all European states are members, made an official statement condemning the execution: "The trial of Saddam Hussein was a missed opportunity ... It was an opportunity for Iraq to join the civilized world. The former Iraqi president was a ruthless criminal who deserved to be punished, but it was wrong to kill him. Saddam Hussein is no longer paying for his crimes; he is simply dead ... The death penalty is cruel and barbaric, and I call on the Iraqi authorities to abolish it. It is late, but not too late, for Iraq to join the great majority of civilized and democratic countries in the world who have already abolished the death penalty."

Perhaps one of the most vocal European leaders was Romano Prodi, the Prime Minister of Italy, who announced that his government would be campaigning at the UN for a worldwide moratorium on the death penalty. A number of Italian political figures and parties expressed disgust at the execution, and Prodi planned to use Italy's recent admission as a temporary member of the UN Security Council to campaign the General Assembly to adopt a moratorium.

In Turkey, the leader of the main opposition Republican People's Party, Deniz Baykal, expressed sorrow over the execution of Saddam, saying, "It is impossible to understand the rejoicing of those who put pressure on every country, including Turkey, for years to abolish the death sentence."

Hamas called the execution of Saddam a "political assassination." Saudi Arabia expressed "surprise and dismay" and regretted the "politicization" of the trial.

A Reuters reporter based in Afghanistan cited a top Taliban commander saying the death of Saddam "will boost the morale of Muslims. The jihad in Iraq will be intensified and attacks on invader forces will increase." Fauzan Al Anshori, from the Islamic group of Majelis Mujahidin Indonesia, said Bush, too, should stand trial. "Given the crimes blamed on Saddam, it is unfair if George Bush is not also put before an international tribunal", he said. "Saddam was executed for killing 148 people, Iraqi Shi'a Muslims, while Bush is responsible for the killing of about 600,000 Iraqis since the March 2003 invasion."

=== Respect and concerns ===
Many other governments, including Canada, Indonesia, Pakistan, Thailand, and Greece, expressed concerns and wishes for stability in Iraq, without passing judgment on whether or not Saddam should have been executed. Respect for the Iraqi judicial process and the judgment in this case was expressed by many other leaders and government officials, including those of Afghanistan, China, Japan, the Czech Republic, France, Germany, Iceland, Ireland, the United Kingdom, Australia, and New Zealand.

=== Support ===
Peruvian president, Alan García, expressed approval for the execution of Saddam Hussein: "He deserved the maximum sentence in his country" and was "guilty of genocide" for using chemical weapons against other peoples for their religion or their racial origin. However, García questioned the legitimacy of the process against him, saying, "the trial was made in an occupied country. I don’t know if he was hanged for his crimes or just by the occupying forces." Israel said that Saddam "had brought about his own demise" and Poland expressed approval of the execution. A spokesman for Poland's president said, "justice has been meted out to a criminal who murdered thousands of people in Iraq."

In the United States, President George W. Bush made a statement, "Bringing Saddam Hussein to justice will not end the violence in Iraq, but it is an important milestone on Iraq's course to becoming a democracy that can govern, sustain, and defend itself." Celebration in the United States occurred in at least one location in Dearborn, Michigan, at the corner of Warren and Greenfield, a heavily Shi'a Iraqi-American community.

In Iran, members of the Islamic Republic expressed joy at the news of Saddam's execution: "The Iraqi people are the victorious ones." Iran's Deputy Foreign Minister Hamid-Reza Assefi told the Islamic Republic News Agency, while expressing regrets that his trial only focused on one of his crimes and not the one million killed during the Iran–Iraq War of 1980–88.

=== Copycat hangings ===
There were reports of copycat deaths influenced by the media coverage. Sergio Pelico, a 10-year-old boy in Webster, Texas, United States, hanged himself in his bedroom. His mother stated that the boy had previously watched a news report about Saddam's execution and decided to hang himself as a form of experimentation. In Multan, Pakistan, a 9-year-old boy also died apparently copying the televised execution; his 10-year-old sister assisted with the hanging. A 15-year-old girl from Kolkata, India was reported to have hanged herself after becoming extremely depressed by watching the execution. Copycat hangings were blamed for the deaths of seven people worldwide.

== Non-governmental organizations ==
- Office of the United Nations High Commissioner for Human Rights: "All sections of Iraqi society, as well as the wider international community, have an interest in ensuring that a death sentence provided for in Iraqi law is only imposed following a trial and appeal process that is, and is legitimately seen as, fair, credible and impartial. That is especially so in a case as exceptional as this one." – High Commissioner Louise Arbour
- Human Rights Watch: "Saddam Hussein was responsible for massive human rights violations, but that can't justify giving him the death penalty, which is a cruel and inhuman punishment." "History will judge the deeply flawed Dujail trial and this execution harshly." – Director Richard Dicker
- Amnesty International USA: "The rushed execution of Saddam Hussein is simply wrong. It signifies justice denied for countless victims who endured unspeakable suffering during his regime, and now have been denied their right to see justice served." – Executive Director Larry Cox
- International Federation for Human Rights: "This death sentence will generate more violence and deepen the cycle of killing for revenge in Iraq. It is primarily a settling of old scores rather than any attempt at a just sentence; the whole process is an affront to the dignity and the rights of victims." – President Sidiki Kaba

== Reactions in media ==
Since the release of the amateur video footage of the execution, several commentators have criticized the atmosphere of the hanging. John Simpson of BBC News stated that the execution "is shown to be an ugly, degrading business, which was more reminiscent of a public hanging in the 18th century than a considered act of 21st century official justice." Toby Dodge, an expert on Iraq, of Queen Mary, University of London stated that the showing of the execution on television "conforms to a brutal logic that Saddam Hussein used himself" and went further by saying that "this isn't even victor's justice, this is the tawdry work of an insecure government", particularly since Prime Minister Nouri al-Maliki forced through Saddam's execution just four days after the appeals court upheld his conviction.

The Times commented in its online edition that, in the moments immediately preceding the hanging, "the scene had begun to resemble a medieval execution or a wild hanging in Texas" amid repeated instances of taunts hurled at Saddam that drowned out the lonely voice of an unidentified person calling for calm in the face of the gravity of the situation. Writing in The Hindu, Siddharth Varadarajan compared the filming and circulation of Saddam's execution video to the picture postcards of American lynchings of African-Americans in the Deep South in the early years of the 20th century.

John Burns and Marc Santora, writing in The New York Times, described the execution as "a sectarian free-for-all that had the effect, on the video recordings, of making Mr. Hussein, a mass murderer, appear dignified and restrained, and his executioners, representing Shi'ites who were his principal victims, seem like bullying street thugs." British Pakistani writer Tariq Ali denounced the proceedings, contrasting more favorably the trials of Nazi criminals after World War II with the trial of Saddam, "Where Nuremberg was a more dignified application of victor's justice, Saddam's trial has, till now, been the crudest and most grotesque."
