= 2007 Port of Tacoma protests =

Tacoma-based protests

In March 2007, high-profile protests were focused on the Port of Tacoma, in Tacoma, Washington, United States. The protests, which lasted for 11 days, centered on a shipment of Stryker vehicles belonging to the 4th Brigade, 2nd Infantry Division, which were scheduled to ship through the Port of Tacoma to the Iraq War. During the protests, members of Port Militarization Resistance tried to obstruct the shipping operations. A total of 37 protesters were arrested.

== Port Militarization Resistance ==
Port Militarization Resistance (PMR) is an anti-war organization in the United States focused on trying to stop the Iraq War through disrupting shipments bound for the battlefield. This is accomplished through a mixture of direct action and indirect action, with less emphasis on trying to persuade elected officials to change policy. As well as organizing the Port of Tacoma protests, PMR has also organized high-profile protests at the Port of Olympia, both in May 2006 and in November 2007.

== Background ==
After the May 2006 Port of Olympia protests concluded, many people anticipated and announced that similar protests would coincide with the next major war shipment leaving Fort Lewis. Many of these announcements were made even before the time and location of these shipments had been announced. Port Militarization Resistance organizers expected the shipments to return through the Port of Olympia.

== Chronology of events ==
Beginning 2 March 2007, Stryker vehicles and other equipment from the 4th Brigade, 2nd Infantry Division, based out of Fort Lewis, was convoyed onto the grounds of the Port of Tacoma, to be loaded onto the Iraq-bound USNS Soderman. Protests began on the Port of Tacoma grounds late at night on 3/4 March, and concluded the afternoon of 15 March, two days after the USNS Soderman's departure. Protests largely happened in the middle of the night, as the military chose to run its convoys at night instead of during the day.

The first major incident of the Port of Tacoma protests occurred the night of 4 March, when three PMR organizers were arrested by police. Of them, one had been shot with a rubber bullet at point blank range, and another had been struck with a Taser three times as he was pinned down.

Over the next several days, protests over the shipments spread across Tacoma. Several more people were arrested or threatened with arrest. A legal observer was arrested for approaching a police officer to ask a question. A previous arrestee was again arrested at a Tacoma City Council meeting for speaking too long. And a PMR videographer, while filming legally, was ordered to turn off his camera or else it would be broken. Also, police instituted a ban on backpacks in the protest area, arresting one individual for defying the ban.

The night of Friday, 9 March, not long after the USNS Soderman arrived, the next major incident of this round of port protests occurred. Demonstrators marched through the Port of Tacoma grounds until they came to a line of police, at which point they stopped and sat down. Protesters report that police then shot rubber bullets at them at point blank range and fired tear gas canisters at them as artillery. A police spokesperson had claimed protesters had provoked this response, however video released later showed the spokesperson to be lying.

On the afternoon of Sunday, 11 March, Port Militarization Resistance organized a non-violent civil disobedience action. This action was coordinated with Tacoma police. The first wave involved 8 people bringing backpacks containing such items as the U.S. Constitution into the no-backpack zone. The second wave involved 15 people reading a Citizens' Injunction against the war, climbing over police barricades, and being subsequently soft-arrested.

Protesters returned to the Port of Tacoma tideflats on the evening of 12 March. After a rally described "peaceful" by a Tacoma police detective, police began firing tear gas into the crowd of protesters, chasing them to the edge of the port grounds. Protesters had to negotiate with police to be allowed back on port grounds to retrieve their cars.

The USNS Soderman left early in the morning of 13 March. Port Militarization Resistance organizers agreed to carry through with demonstrations they had already scheduled. The March 2007 Port of Tacoma protests concluded with a vigil the afternoon of 15 March, in which a coffin was carried in a funeral march to the gate of the port quay. All told, 37 arrests were made.

== Fallout ==
The increased police presence cost the city of Tacoma an unbudgeted $500,000. The city is considering sending the bill for the extra security to the military.

The city of Tacoma has instructed its Citizen Review Panel to investigate allegations of police misconduct at the Port of Tacoma. Except for the "Film Is Not a Crime" incident, the city has said it will not investigate individual allegations of misconduct, citing police union contracts.

== Court cases ==
The city of Tacoma chose to pursue criminal charges against many of the arrestees. So far, most of the cases have been dismissed before going to trial. As of 6 March 2008, two cases have gone to trial, both resulting in a mix of convictions on some charges and acquittals on others. These convictions were the first convictions of any arrestees in Port Militarization Resistance actions.

== Additional items of note ==
Throughout the protests, PMR organizers made use of Internet media, especially the website YouTube. On some occasions, video of objectionable police behavior was viewable online only a few hours after it occurred. One video, "Film Is Not a Crime," was instrumental in inspiring the only internal investigation began by the Tacoma Police Department in regards to the protests.

== See also ==
- 2017 May Day protests
