= Death of Fashad Mohamed =

Iraqi torture victim

Fashad Mohamed (Arabic: فشاد محمد; fashadun muhamad) was an Iraqi who died in custody on April 5, 2004. He was alleged to have been captured and beaten by SEAL team 7. He was hooded, sleep deprived, and soaked with extremely hot and cold water. When he was finally allowed to sleep he did not wake up.
