= 2005 Hit convoy ambush =

Coordinates: 33.633°N 42.816°E

- Part of the Post-invasion Iraq
Date	May 9, 2005
Location	Hit, Iraq
Result	Insurgent victory

Belligerents
Private military contractors	Ansar al-Sunna

Strength
17 contractors	Unknown

Casualties and losses
16 killed 1 captured (later died of wounds)	Unknown if any

The 2005 Hit convoy ambush was an ambush by Iraqi insurgents of a convoy that was carrying military supplies for U.S. forces. The convoy was escorted by private military contractors. The ambush ended with the death of all the contractors.

== Ambush ==
On May 9, 2005, a supply convoy left the U.S. military air base at Al Asad, Iraq. The convoy was escorted by 12 Iraqi, 4 South African and 1 Japanese private military contractor. Almost immediately after they exited the base they were observed by Iraqi insurgents. The insurgents then prepared a well planned ambush for the convoy. While the vehicles were passing near the city of Hit, 170 kilometers (105 mi) northwest of Baghdad, the insurgents struck. The ambush was complex and well planned, incorporating the use of multiple improvised explosive devices, rocket propelled grenades, machine gun fire and small arms fire. The vehicles got stuck in the ambush were unable to pull back. For several hours a fierce battle raged and by morning the convoy was decimated. U.S. military helicopters arrived at the scene only after dawn broke. Insurgent propaganda footage showed burning trucks and SUV's with bodies littering the streets. 16 of the 17 security contractors were killed and the Japanese man was seriously wounded and captured. Insurgent casualties, if any, were unknown.

== Aftermath ==
Following the attack there was much confusion over what really happened, but the only thing definitely confirmed was that a Japanese security contractor was wounded and captured in the attack.

Akihiko Saito was seriously wounded in the attack and captured by the insurgents. This raised the public debate in Japan to new heights whether Japanese troops should stay in Iraq or leave. Saito had been in the Japanese military until 1981, when he left the Japanese Self-Defense Forces and joined the French Foreign Legion. He had been working with Hart Security Ltd. as a security specialist at the time of his capture.

The militants tried to provide him with medical aid but it was not enough. It was reported on May 12 that he had died of his wounds.
