= Chlorine bombings in Iraq =

2004–2007 insurgent campaign

Chlorine Bombings in Iraq
- Part of the Iraq War, Iraqi insurgency, and the Iraqi civil war
Date	October 2004 – June 2007
Location	Iraq

Belligerents
Insurgents	Iraqi security forces, U.S. military

Chlorine bombings in Iraq began as early as October 2004, when insurgents in Al Anbar province started using chlorine gas in conjunction with conventional vehicle-borne explosive devices.

The inaugural chlorine attacks in Iraq were described as poorly executed, probably because much of the chemical agent was rendered nontoxic by the heat of the accompanying explosives. Subsequent, more refined, attacks resulted in hundreds of injuries, but have proven not to be a viable means of inflicting massive loss of life. Their primary impact has therefore been to cause widespread panic, with large numbers of civilians suffering non life-threatening, but nonetheless highly traumatic, injuries.

Chlorine was used as a poison gas in World War I, but was delivered by artillery shell, unlike the modern stationary or car bombs. Still, its function as a weapon in both instances is similar. Low level exposure results in burning sensations to the eyes, nose and throat, usually accompanied by dizziness, nausea and vomiting. Higher levels of exposure can cause fatal lung damage; but because the gas is heavier than air it will not dissipate until well after an explosion, it is generally considered ineffective as an improvised chemical weapon.

== Western media linking chlorine attacks to 'al Qaeda' ==
In February 2007, a U.S. military spokesman said that ‘al Qaeda propaganda material’ had been found at a factory for chlorine chemical weapons in Karma, east of Fallujah, which led press agency Reuters to the conclusion that that “chlorine bomb factory was al Qaeda's”.

== Attacks ==
- October 21, 2006: A car bomb carrying 12 120 mm mortar shells and two 100-pound chlorine tanks detonated, wounding three Iraqi policemen and a civilian in Ramadi.
- January 28, 2007: A suicide bomber drove a dump truck carrying explosives and a chlorine tank into an emergency response unit compound in Ramadi. 16 people were killed by the explosives, but none by the chlorine.
- February 19, 2007: A suicide bombing in Ramadi involving chlorine killed two Iraqi security forces and wounded 16 other people.
- February 20, 2007: A bomb blew up a tanker carrying chlorine north of Baghdad, killing nine and emitting fumes that made 148 others ill, including 42 women and 52 children.
- February 21, 2007: A pickup truck carrying chlorine gas cylinders exploded in Baghdad, killing at least five people and hospitalizing over 50.
- March 16, 2007: Three separate suicide attacks on this day used chlorine. The first attack occurred at a checkpoint northeast of Ramadi when a truck bomb wounded one US service member and one Iraqi civilian. A second truck bomb detonated in Falluja, killing two policemen and leaving a hundred Iraqis showing signs of chlorine exposure. Forty minutes later, yet another chlorine-laden truck bomb exploded at the entrance to a housing estate south of Falluja, this time injuring 250 and according to some reports killing six.
- March 28, 2007: Suicide bombers detonated a pair of truck bombs, one containing chlorine, as part of a sustained attack aimed at the Fallujah Government Center. The initial bombings along with a subsequent gun battle left 14 American forces and 57 Iraqi forces wounded.
- April 6, 2007: A chlorine-laden suicide truck bomb detonated at a police checkpoint in Ramadi, leaving 27 dead. Thirty people were hospitalized with wounds from the explosion, while many more suffered breathing difficulties attributed to the chlorine gas.
- April 25, 2007: A chlorine truck bomb detonated at a military checkpoint on the western outskirts of Baghdad, killing one Iraqi and wounding two others.
- April 30, 2007: A tanker laden with chlorine exploded near a restaurant west of Ramadi, killing six people and wounding 10.
- May 15, 2007: A chlorine bomb exploded in an open-air market in the village of Abu Sayda in Diyala province, killing 32 people and injuring 50.
- May 20, 2007: A suicide truck bomber exploded his vehicle Sunday near an Iraqi police checkpoint outside Ramadi, Zangora district west of Ramadi, killing two police officers and wounding 11 others.
- June 3, 2007: A car bomb exploded outside a U.S. military base in Diyala, unleashing a noxious cloud of chlorine gas that sickened at least 62 soldiers but caused no serious injuries.

== See also ==
- 2007 Iraq cholera outbreak
- Iraqi insurgency (2003–2011)
