= December 2007 Turkish incursion into northern Iraq =

Turkish air campaign against Kurdish Workers Party

- Part of the Kurdish–Turkish conflict
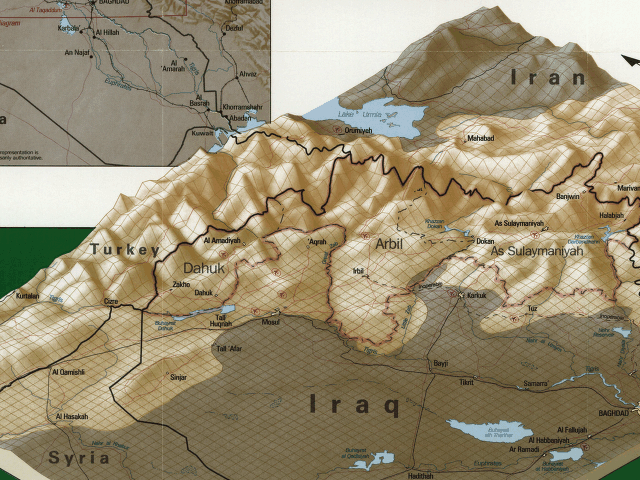
- 3D map of the North Iraq area
Date	December 16, 2007 – December 26, 2007
Location	northern Iraq
Result	Turkish victory

Belligerents
Turkey	PKK

Strength
52 war planes	2,320–2,640 fighters in camps

Casualties and losses
None	Unknown, multiple PKK Camps destroyed.

The December 2007 Turkish incursion into northern Iraq, by the Turkish Air Force, began on 16 December 2007, when the Turkish Military bombed Kurdistan Workers' Party (PKK) targets in northern Iraq.

== Timeline ==
=== December 16 ===
Turkish Air Forces launched an operation against PKK targets in Qandil Mountains. According to Turkish claims, aerial bombardment and airstrikes targeting both closed areas and exposed militias resulted with deaths of 150 to 175 PKK militias.

=== December 17 ===
Turkish forces bombed the region for 4 hours in the second day of operation. A group of PKK militias trying to cross the border between Turkey-Iraq were also targeted. To this day, operation has cost the economy of Turkey an estimated as $20,000,000.

=== December 18 ===
A campaign of aerial bombardment was launched in border regions of Şemdinli and Yeşilova to prevent more PKK militias from crossing the Turkish border.

=== December 19 ===
Airstrikes against PKK targets in region continued on December 19.

=== December 22 ===
Turkish bombardment in region started at 14:30 and destroyed 4 PKK camps in 2,5 hours, resulting in high casualties among PKK militias.

=== December 25 ===
Another Turkish bombardment campaign was launched near Amadiya with 4 war planes against PKK targets. PKK claims this operation actually targeted civilians and destroyed 3 Kurdish villages.

=== December 26 ===
Several airstrikes targeting 8 different shelters used by PKK was launched, resulting in high casualties among PKK militias.

== Casualties ==
=== Military ===
Turkish government claimed that up to 175 PKK militias were killed on 16 December alone and thousands of PKK militias were wounded in the operation. Other Turkish claims and estimates reported 200 deaths among PKK militias during the operation. PKK denied these claims and said Turkish military only bombed civilian areas and empty lands, giving no casualties to PKK militias.

=== Civilians ===
PKK claimed that Turkish war planes deliberately bombed hospitals and 10 Kurdish villages were destroyed as a result of bombardments. PKK also claimed a Kurdish women was killed by Turkish forces in the operation. Turkey denied these claims.

United Nations High Commission for Refugees said that 1,800 villagers from villages around Sulaymaniyah and Erbil in Northern Iraq have been displaced as a result of operation.
