= Invasion of Iraq prisoner escapes =

Prisoner escapes since the 2003 invasion of Iraq

During the Iraq War, many insurgents, al-Qaeda and militant fighters were captured and held at military bases in the region. On several occasions, there were instances of prisoner escapes.

== 2007 ==
- March, eleven Iraqi prisoners escaped from the British-run military prison at Shuaiba Base, after ten of them swapped their outfits with visitors to the prison. No details were given on the eleventh prisoner.

== 2006 ==
- December 10, Ayman Sabawi an insurgent financier serving fifteen years imprisonment for possession of illegal weapons and manufacture of explosives, escaped from prison with the help of a local police officer. He was the nephew of deposed leader Saddam Hussein.
- May 9, five prisoners escaped the US-run Fort Suse military prison. While their names were not released to the media, photographs of the three Arab, one Kurdish and one unknown escapee were distributed to local residents.

== 2005 ==
- December 28, a failed escape attempt at Adala Base by sixteen prisoners left four prisoners, four guards and an interpreter dead, after the prisoners stormed the military prison's armoury and one prisoner got a hold of an AK-47 rifle and began shooting. The incident prompted Busho Ibrahim Ali, Deputy Justice Minister for Prisons, to state that negligence was at fault and Iraqi troops were unprepared to run prisons.
- March 26, after noticing clay and dirt clogging one of the camp toilets, guards at Camp Bucca military prison discovered two "extremely elaborate" tunnels built by prisoners in preparation of a mass escape. It is believed the prisoners were waiting for poor weather to aid their flight. One of the tunnels was dug beneath a floorboard, and extended more than 600 feet, past the security fence surrounding the prison. The tunnels ran ten feet beneath the surface, and were 2–3 feet in diameter.
