= National Network to End the War Against Iraq =

The National Network to End the War Against Iraq (NNEWAI) (2001–2004) was the first formal coalition in the United States founded specifically to oppose the policy of economic sanctions and ongoing bombing of targets inside Iraq.

== History ==
The network was founded in February 2001 at the Second National Organizing Conference on Iraq, held in Denver, Colorado and hosted by the Colorado Campaign for Middle East Peace. The first National Organizing Conference on Iraq had been held in October 1999 at Ann Arbor, Michigan, where proposals for the formation of the network had produced ambiguous results. Subsequent national organizing conferences on Iraq were held in 2002 (Palo Alto, California), 2003 (College Park, Maryland) and 2004 (Bloomington, Indiana). After the 2003 conference, held during the US invasion of Iraq, the network's name was officially changed to the National Grassroots Peace Network (NGPN), but the new name never gained much currency.

During its three-and-a-half-year history, the network grew from around 70 to over 350 member organizations in 48 states. During each year of its existence, the network co-ordinated nationwide protests, vigils and other actions conducted locally by member groups. The network supported the global day of protest against the impending invasion of Iraq on February 15, 2003, the largest protest action in history. On February 15, 2004, the network independently organized a Vigil for Peace in 120 cities in a dozen countries.

== Mission: opposition to sanctions ==
The primary cause that brought network members together was the humanitarian crisis in Iraq resulting from the trade embargo imposed through the United Nations at the urging of the United States and the United Kingdom. Network members were appalled at studies by UNICEF and other UN agencies that showed that the combined effects of the 1991 bombing campaign and sanctions had led to as many as 1.5 million additional Iraqi deaths by 1995, including more than 500,000 children.

== Organizing philosophy ==
Tensions between local member groups and existing national organizations existed within the network throughout its existence. The network represents one in a long line of efforts to build a grassroots, "bottom-up" structure of organization to operate within the peace movement. This left the network with a weak center. While the emergence of half a dozen or more national coalitions opposing the US invasion and occupation of Iraq from late 2002 may have made the network's continuation impossible, the network's collapse in late 2004 was primarily due to the inability of member groups to agree on a fundraising strategy to sustain the national office, or whether to pursue incorporation.
