= 2004 Iraq document leak =

Leak of documents on the Iraq invasion

On 18 September 2004 the British Daily Telegraph ran two articles titled "Secret papers show Blair was warned of Iraq chaos" and "Failure is not an option, but it doesn't mean they will avoid it" by reporter Michael Smith, revealing the contents of six leaked British government documents – labelled "secret" or "confidential" – concerning the lead-up to the war in Iraq.

The documents achieved recognition in the US press nine months later, on 18 June 2005, when the Associated Press (AP) published full typed copies of all six papers on its website. The copies were provided by the British reporter, who said he had destroyed the original documents to protect his sources. An anonymous senior British official said the documents appeared authentic.

== Contents ==
AP reported that the memos show: "When Prime Minister Tony Blair's chief foreign policy adviser dined with Condoleezza Rice six months after the September 11 attacks, the then-US national security adviser didn't want to discuss Osama bin Laden or Al-Qaeda. She wanted to talk about 'regime change' in Iraq, setting the stage for the U.S.-led invasion more than a year later."

British Foreign Office political director Peter Ricketts said in one of the memos. "For Iraq, 'regime change' does not stack up. It sounds like a grudge between Bush and Saddam," Ricketts said. (See April 1993 for Saddam's attempted assassination of Bush's father.)

The memos express concern about breaking international law, but Blair is shown as being determined to go to war as Bush's ally regardless.

Tony Dodge, an Iraq expert at the University of London, said, "The documents show what official inquiries in Britain already have, that the case of weapons of mass destruction was based on thin intelligence and was used to inflate the evidence to the level of mendacity. In going to war with Bush, Blair defended the special relationship between the two countries, like other British leaders have. But he knew he was taking a huge political risk at home. He knew the war's legality was questionable and its unpopularity was never in doubt." Dodge also said the memos show that Blair was aware that postwar instability in Iraq was likely.

In one of the memos, David Manning, who was Blair's chief foreign policy adviser, reported on a meeting in Washington, D.C., with Rice;

It is clear that Bush is grateful for your [Blair's] support and has registered that you are getting flak. I said that you would not budge in your support for regime change but you had to manage a press, a Parliament and a public opinion that was very different from anything in the States. And you would not budge either in your insistence that, if we pursued regime change, it must be very carefully done and produce the right result. Failure was not an option.

I told Condi that we realized that the [Bush] administration could go it alone ... But if it wanted company, it would have to take account of its potential coalition partners. In particular:

The UN dimension. The issue of the weapons inspectors must be handled in a way that would persuade European and wider opinion that the U.S. was conscious of the international framework, and the insistence of many countries on the need for a legal base. Renewed refusal by Saddam to accept unfettered inspections would be a powerful argument.

Following a lunch with Paul Wolfowitz, Sir Christopher Meyer wrote a private letter to Manning:

On Iraq I opened by sticking very closely to the script that you used with Condi Rice last week. We backed regime change, but the plan had to be clever and failure was not an option... The US could go it alone if it wanted to. But if it wanted to act with partners, there had to be a strategy for building support for military action against Saddam. I then went through the need to wrongfoot Saddam on the inspectors and the UN security council resolutions and the critical importance of the Middle East peace plan.

A 22 March memo from Ricketts to Foreign Secretary Jack Straw said,

But even the best survey of Iraq's WMD programmes will not show much advance in recent years on the nuclear, missile or CW/BW (chemical or biological weapons) fronts: the programmes are extremely worrying but have not, as far as we know, been stepped up. U.S. scrambling to establish a link between Iraq and al-Qaida is so far frankly unconvincing. To get public and Parliamentary support for military action, we have to be convincing that: the threat is so serious/imminent that it is worth sending our troops to die for; it is qualitatively different from the threat posed by other proliferators who are closer to achieving nuclear capability (including Iran).

== Documents ==
1. Overseas and Defence Secretariat, Cabinet Office, "Iraq: Options Paper", 8 March 2002 (pdf)
2. David Manning, letter to Prime Minister on dinner with Condoleezza Rice, 14 March 2002 (pdf)
3. Christopher Meyer, note on Sunday lunch with Paul Wolfowitz, to David Manning, 18 March 2002 (pdf)
4. Peter Ricketts, letter to Jack Straw, 22 March 2002 (pdf)
5. Jack Straw, letter to the Prime Minister, 25 March 2002 (pdf)
6. Foreign Office Legal Briefing (pdf)
- pre-Downing Street memo, also known as DSM II (Letter to Ministers: IRAQ: CONDITIONS FOR MILITARY ACTION), 21 July 2002
- Downing Street memo, 23 July 2002
- Goldsmith memo, 7 March 2003
- Deputy Legal Advisor to the Foreign Office – letter of resignation, 18 March 2003

== See also ==
- Downing Street memo
- Office of Special Plans
- Operation Southern Focus
- David Kelly
- September Dossier
- Dodgy Dossier
- Declaration of war by the United States
- Executive Order 13233
- Executive Order 13303
- Governments' pre-war positions on invasion of Iraq
- The UN Security Council and the Iraq war
- Resignations of UK cabinet ministers Robin Cook and Clare Short
- Legal opinion on war by UK Attorney General
- Bush-Blair memo
