= 2007 Iraq cholera outbreak =

Disease outbreak in Iraq

Cholera is a disease caused by unclean drinking water that only actually affects roughly 5% of those who are exposed. Those who are affected can die within hours. During the Persian Gulf War, American forces targeted Iraqi infrastructure, leading to the deaths of an estimated minimum of 110,000 civilians from the destruction of infrastructure alone. Iraq's infrastructure, including its water infrastructure, was severely weakened after the war. In 1991, the first post-war report on conditions in Iraq by the United Nations described the material conditions as "pre–industrial revolution" due to the "apocalyptic damage" done to the countries basic infrastructure by American bombings.

Years of trade restrictions, poor management and corruption, and the subsequent 2003 American Invasion of Iraq and Civil War further damaged water infrastructure. By 2004, an estimated 73% of Iraq's urban population and 43% of Iraq's rural population did not have access to potable water, while nearly 25% of the population of Baghdad had no access to a water network. An additional possible contributing factor was the arrest of several head members and deputies of the Iraqi Health Ministry in February 2007, on charges that the Health Ministry was funneling money into Shi'ite militant groups in Iraq. By 2007, a lack of clean drinking water in Iraq led to an outbreak of cholera. A total of approximately 7,000 people were infected, with 10 deaths reported.

Cholera was first detected in Kirkuk, in Northern Iraq, on 14 August 2007. By September, the outbreak had reached Baghdad and by October of the same year, cholera had spread to 9 out of Iraq's 18 provinces, affecting an estimated 30,000 people and killing 14. The Iraqi government had difficulty treating or preventing the spread, in part because of American restrictions on the importation of chlorine, a chemical used to treat water for cholera. Chlorine was restricted because of worries the chemicals would be used by terrorists to make explosives. A shipment of 100,000 tons of chlorine was held up at the Jordanian border because of these concerns. According to Ryadh Abdul Ameer, the director of the Basra health ministry, basic water sterilization became impossible in some places due to restrictions on the availability of chlorine for water sterilization. Although the outbreak ended in December 2007, Iraq has seen persistent outbreaks of cholera since.

== See also ==
- Chlorine bombings in Iraq
