= Iraqi map pendant =

Pendant in the shape of Iraq

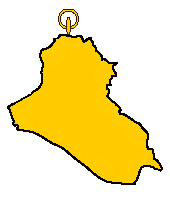
A representation of an Iraqi map pendant.

An Iraqi map pendant, usually worn on women's necklaces, has achieved some popularity as a symbol of Iraqi unity in the face of the widespread ethnic and sectarian violence in the country.

== Origin ==
Necklaces with map pendants were sold before the 2003 invasion, but they were not especially common. They have gained currency thereafter, and especially as a statement against the subsequent development of communal violence and increased social balkanization.

The necklaces have been prominently worn by a number of Iraqi women television journalists. Many women have adopted the necklace in tribute to the life of journalist Atwar Bahjat, who was murdered in 2006.

== Practices ==
The pendant necklaces are commonly sold in silver and gold, for the equivalent of about US$15 and $100 respectively.

Iraqi men have also worn map pendants as lapel pins, and some have pinned them to military uniforms.

== Sources ==
- Rageh, Rawya (Sep. 2, 2006). "For Iraqi women, map-shaped necklaces become a symbol of defiance, yearning for unity". Associated Press.
- Tarabay, Jamie (April 8, 2007). "Maps of Iraq Symbolize Unity Call". All Things Considered (radio broadcast). National Public Radio.
