= Tent State University =

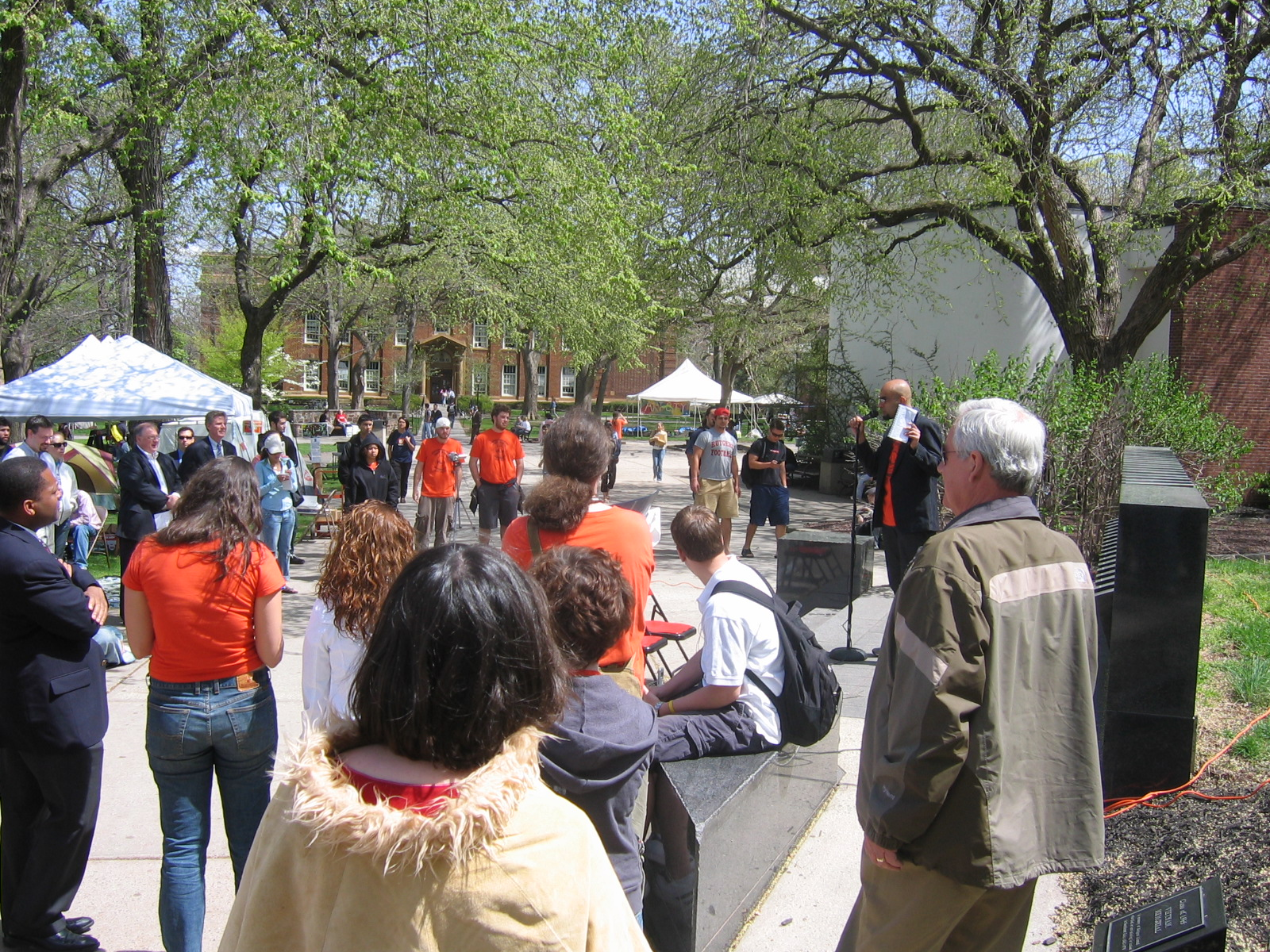
A speech being made at Tent State protest, Rutgers University, 2006.

Tent State University is a national movement at various universities in the United States and England in which students, staff and community members set up tents and build an alternative university. This model is used to facilitate collective activism and student organizing.

== Focus ==
The main lobbying focus is on policies which harm higher education. This includes taking funding away from education at the federal and state level, the lack of democratic influence in school governance, and rejecting the annual excuse of a budget crisis. It also calls special attention to the war in Iraq which consumes a large amount of resources which could be spent on higher education.

Tent State is distinct in its emphasis on democracy at all levels of society: "People who work together make decisions together, and people who make decisions together work together." It also places a tactical emphasis on coalition building across diverse communities.

== Spread ==
The movement started at Rutgers University in 2003 and has spread to many other schools. Universities involved include the University of California, as well as the Madison campus of the University of Wisconsin, the University of Missouri, campus of the University of Massachusetts Amherst, the University of Connecticut, SUNY, Rowan University, and Tent State UK at the University of Sussex. Even though its main focus is higher education and democracy in the United States, an increasing number of left-wing organizations have used Tent State as a forum for discussions on a broad range of issues.
