= Rizgar Mohammed Amin =

Iraqi judge

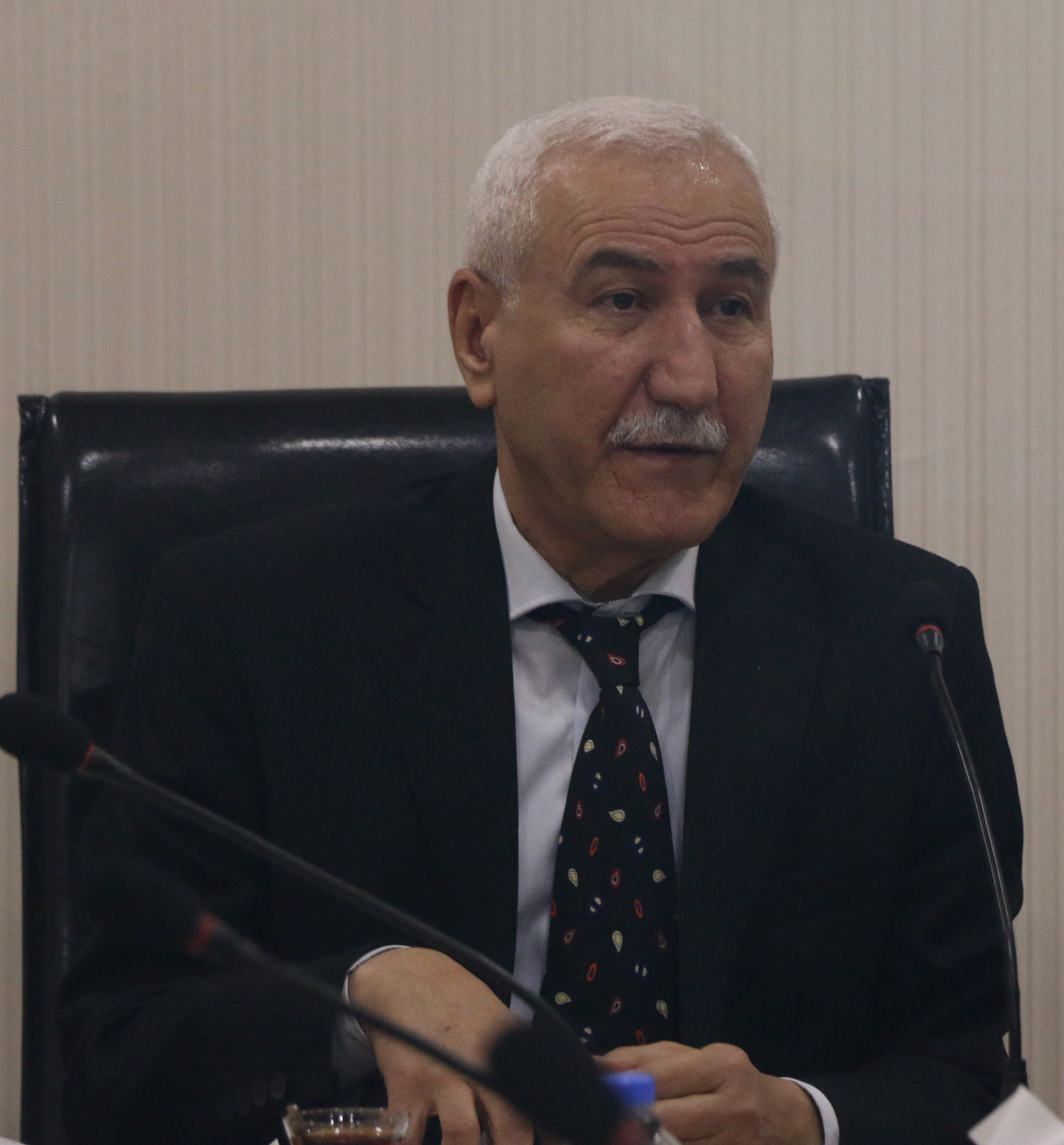
- Rizgar Mohammed Amin

Chief Judge of the Iraqi Special Tribunal
- In office 19 October 2005 – 14 January 2006
- Appointed by: Jalal Talabani
- Succeeded by: Rauf Rashid Abd al-Rahman

Rizgar Mohammed Amin (Arabic: رزكار محمد أمين) (born 1957) is the former chief judge of the Iraqi Special Tribunal's Al-Dujail trial. He is the only judge whose name was revealed on the trial's opening on 19 October 2005, the names of the other four judges and all but two of his four colleagues faces not allowed to be shown during the televised portions of the trial.(Telegraph.co.uk – 12:30AM GMT 15 January 2006)

Amin graduated from the Law School of Baghdad University in 1980. He is an ethnic Kurd, though he has no record of political activism, or connections to the Peshmerga. He was a regional judge during the presidency of Saddam Hussein. Amin lives in Sulaymaniyah with his wife Nazanin Ahmed (born 1962) and four children, born between 1990 and 2001.

Because he had refused to join the Ba'ath party, he was only admitted to the college of judges in 1990, after working in a subordinate position for ten years. Amin was appointed chief judge of the regional court by Jalal Talabani in the mid-1990s.

On 14 January 2006, he resigned as chief judge of the trials of Saddam Hussein, due to government interference and harsh public criticism. He was replaced by Rauf Rashid Abd al-Rahman.
