= Theaters Against War =

THAW Logo

Theaters Against War (THAW), was a coalition of theaters and volunteer theater artists organized to protest the Iraq War and the perceived concomitant restrictions on civil liberties in the US. As of November 2007, THAW had more than 250 member theaters, largely in New York City, but with some representation through the United States and abroad.

THAW was formed at a meeting at Performance Space 122 in New York City on December 9, 2002 to organize a citywide theater-based anti-war protest for March 2, 2003. After the initial protest, THAW continued to participate in protests and theater events, such as 2006's Culture Project Impact Festival and United for Peace and Justice's March 18, 2007 "NYC March to End the War".
