= Abu Sayda chlorine bombing =

2007 chlorine car bombing attack on a Shia village in Iraq

- Location: Abu Sayda, Diyala, Iraq
- Date: 15 May 2007 (UTC+3)
- Target: Village market
- Attack type: Iraqi chlorine bombing
- Deaths: 32–45
- Injuries: 60

The Abu Sayda bombing was a chlorine car bombing attack that occurred on 15 May 2007, in an open-air market in the Iraqi Diyala Governorate village of Abu Sayda. The attack killed up to 45 people and wounded 60 more in the Shia village, the highest death toll of all chlorine bombings in Iraq. Iraqi and American military sources initially denied the use of chlorine.
