= Arlington Southwest =

American war memorial in Texas

Coordinates: 30.382668°N 103.59937°W

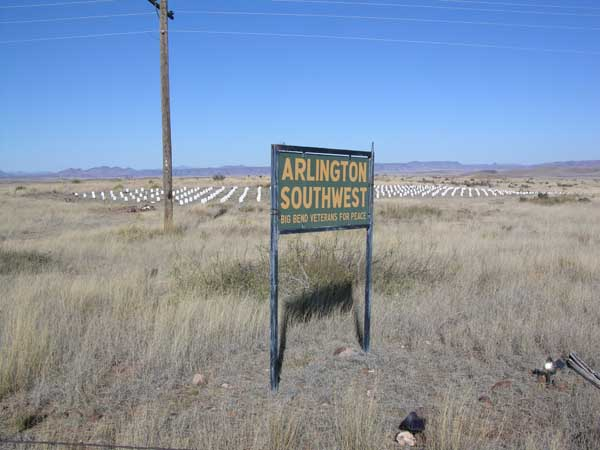
The Arlington Southwest memorial, Alpine, Texas.

Arlington Southwest is an unoccupied cemetery located in Brewster County, Texas, 4 miles (6.4 km) east of Alpine along U.S. Highway 90. Each gravestone serves as a memorial for each individual soldier from Texas killed during the invasion and occupation of Iraq of the early 21st century. Developed by the Big Bend Veterans for Peace, Arlington Southwest is believed to be the first permanent memorial dedicated to those fallen in the war similar to those established as the temporary Arlington West memorials in California in 2003.

The 2-acre (0.0081 km^{2}) memorial was co-designed by Vietnam veteran Tom Curry and local architect Mark Battista. Named after Arlington National Cemetery in Arlington, Virginia, each of the gravestones resemble those erected in the various military cemeteries throughout the United States and are composed of papercrete. At the time of its dedication on November 15, 2007, the cemetery contained 367 tombstones, but has since been expanded with each fatality of a Texan soldier resulting in the placement of an additional tombstone.

The memorial was established as a place for persons to remember both U.S. troops and the Iraqi civilians killed during the course of the Iraq War. The Veterans for Peace decided to use the representation of gravestones for the Texas fallen instead of crosses for all of the American fatalities for war in part due to the smaller pool of volunteer labor to create and maintain the memorial and in order to create a more personal space for those paying their respects.

In 2010 the cemetery was closed and the only thing remaining item left is the sign holder. The private memorial was removed by the owner.
