= Port Militarization Resistance =

American anti-war movement

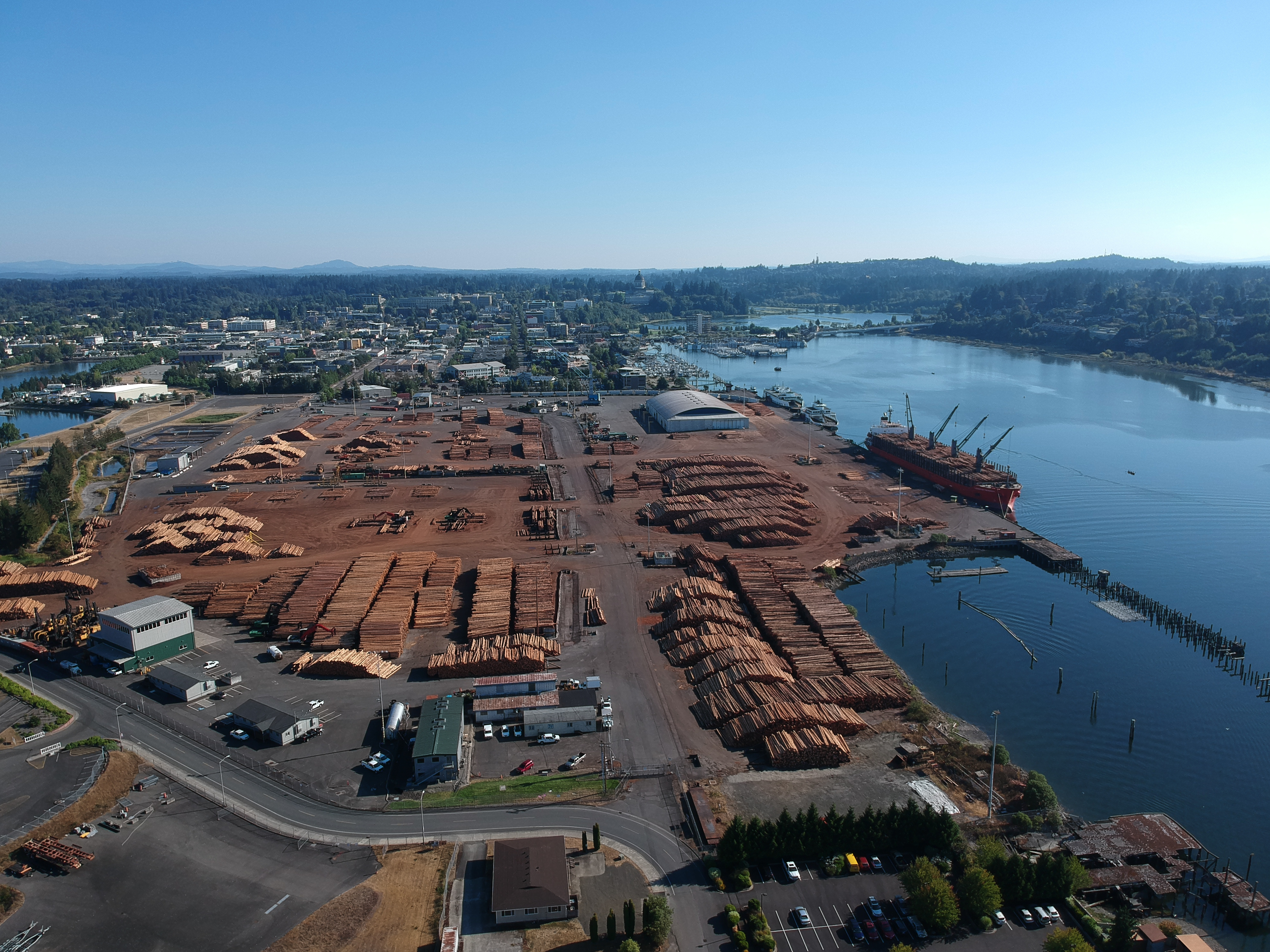

Port Militarization Resistance (PMR) is an anti-war movement in the United States. The movement began in May 2006, in Olympia, Washington, but also has chapters in Tacoma, Washington, Grays Harbor, Washington, and the Mid-Atlantic region. Port Militarization Resistance is also the name of the strategy employed by this movement. Adherents of the PMR strategy advocate an end to the Iraq War and the War in Afghanistan to be accomplished through making civilian-owned ports inaccessible to the military, with less emphasis on persuading elected officials to abandon the war. PMR organized high-profile protests at the Port of Olympia and the Port of Tacoma in 2006, 2007, 2008, and 2009.

== Strategy and tactics ==
While attempts are made to appeal to local governing bodies to cease military shipments, many PMR organizers and port action participants believe these avenues have largely been exhausted. Thus, PMR the movement and adherents of the PMR strategy focus on direct action, a political philosophy which relies on circumventing the authority of elected officials.

Tactics used in PMR actions vary, and have included each of the following:

- daily/nightly vigils
- picketing
- die-ins
- banner drops
- human blockades and locking arms
- civil disobedience such as ignoring police-designated "free-speech zones"
- soft-arrest demonstrations
- physical road blockades
- unpermitted marches
- property damage.

While each of the above listed tactics has been used at PMR hosted protests, PMR does not necessarily endorse each of those, and organizers have from time to time spoken out against various actions taken at its protests.

It has also been suggested by port action participants that one of PMR's most effective tactics is the forcing of local jurisdictions to escalate their security expenses during the shipments, making the shipments less valuable.

Port Militarization Resistance has encouraged participants to engage in a mixture of direct action and indirect action for the purposes of obstructing military shipments. PMR has at times acted as a cohesive unit, and at other times has encouraged members to organize into affinity groups.

Port Militarization Resistance has issued statements committing itself to non-violence. This commitment includes refusals to engage in things like "verbal harassment" and "malicious sabotage." While the movement has never been involved in any act in violation of this commitment, not all participants in port actions consider themselves aligned with PMR the movement, and some have engaged in actions which would be in violation of PMR's commitment to non-violence.

== Pre-PMR port actions ==
The basic strategy of Port Militarization Resistance is not unique to the anti-Iraq War movement. During the Vietnam War, sailors and anti-war activists petitioned local governments to prevent deployments and shipments out of local ports.

Not long after the start of the Iraq War, activists engaged in protests at the Port of Oakland. Police responded by firing wooden pellets and concussion grenades at protesters and longshore workers alike, sending several people to the hospital.

The Port of Olympia was used several times to ship equipment to Iraq before the formation of Port Militarization Resistance. In November 2004, an announcement by the Olympia Movement for Justice and Peace indicated the intent to protest one such shipment. Daily vigils were organized around the port by OMJP. On the night of November 18, individuals unaffiliated with OMJP gathered around the port fence, cutting a large hole in it, prompting heightened security measures. Some witnesses have claimed this breach in security prompted the USNS Cape Intrepid to leave early and without all its intended cargo, while the military maintains there was no disruption to its operations.

The following week, anti-war activists packed a meeting of the Port of Olympia Commissioners expressing opposition to the military shipments, only to discover the Commissioners had already decided to continue military shipments in the future. Contracted vessels continued to ship equipment and munitions to Iraq through the Port of Olympia a few more times over the next several months. While each of these shipments were met with passive protest, no direct action occurred until May 2006.

== Port of Olympia – May 2006 ==
From May 22, 2006 until May 31, 2006, equipment belonging to the 3rd Brigade, 2nd Infantry Division, based out of Fort Lewis, was convoyed onto the Port of Olympia quay, to be loaded onto the USNS Pomeroy to be delivered to Iraq. This equipment included Stryker vehicles, as well as various munitions and unlabeled equipment. Despite prior shipments being met with passive protest, press accounts at the time indicate no resistance to the convoys were expected.

While some demonstrations and arrests occurred in the first two days, the first major actions occurred on 24 May. Several people lined across the road in a human chain, obstructing the path of a Stryker convoy. Several participants reported they were mishandled by police. A detour was forced when Olympia police proved unable to move one of the blockade participants, Ultimate Fighting champion Jeff Monson, out of the street. The second attempt to enter the port quay was successful after Olympia police parted a line of protesters linked with PVC pipes.

The protests, blockade attempts, and arrests continued sporadically for the next several days. Tent cities were established near the port grounds. Protesters reportedly kept constant watch on the port grounds, even after the Strykers finished convoying in. During this time, participants report being followed by police, even away from the scene of the protest.

The protests intensified on 29 May as participants expected the USNS Pomeroy to arrive that evening. After night fell, protesters lined along the Port of Olympia fence and began shaking it. Police then deployed pepper spray into the crowd on two occasions. Demonstrators then marched through downtown Olympia before breaking up for the night.

At 4:00 pm on 30 May, several demonstrators, many of them masked, gathered at a busy intersection in Olympia. From this intersection, the crowd marched to the front gate of the Port of Olympia, chanting "Port of Olympia! Tear it down! Port of Olympia! Tear it down!" Members of the crowd tore down the front gate of the port, and several people ran in and laid down in the entranceway. Police jabbed participants with batons, and maced several more before arresting those who would not disperse. 22 people were arrested. Many other demonstrators remained near the port the remainder of the evening, draping banners on the public port watchtower and building an art display around it. The police attacked the crowd again that evening with pepper spray and rubber bullets. One individual was reportedly struck with a Taser.

In the late afternoon of 31 May, the USNS Pomeroy departed the Port of Olympia for Iraq with all its cargo aboard. Protesters staged a die-in on the bank of Budd Inlet, and shared final words in wrapping the May 2006 Port of Olympia protests to a close. There were no arrests nor any reports of police actions that day.

A total of 37 arrests were made during the May 2006 round of port protests. The estimated cost of security for the port was just over $14,000. As of March 2007, it was not yet decided whether the bill would be covered by the military, the city of Olympia, or the Port of Olympia.

Supporters and critics of Port Militarization Resistance alike see the protests at the Port of Olympia in May 2006 as setting the stage for all future port protests. This round is cited as being the origin of Port Militarization Resistance, as well as that of the Olympia chapter of Students for a Democratic Society, based at the Evergreen State College.

== Port of Tacoma – March 2007 ==
Beginning March 2, 2007, Stryker vehicles and other equipment from the 4th Brigade, 2nd Infantry Division, based out of Fort Lewis, was convoyed onto the grounds of the Port of Tacoma, to be loaded onto the Iraq-bound USNS Soderman. Protests began on the Port of Tacoma grounds late at night on March 3/4, and concluded the afternoon of March 15, two days after the USNS Soderman's departure. Protests largely happened in the middle of the night, as the military chose to run its convoys at night instead of during the day.

After the May 2006 protests concluded, many people anticipated and announced that similar protests would coincide with the next major war shipment leaving Fort Lewis. Many of these announcements were made even before the time and location of these shipments had been announced. Port Militarization Resistance organizers expected the shipments to return through the Port of Olympia.

The first major incident of the Port of Tacoma protests occurred the night of March 4, when three PMR organizers were arrested by police. Of them, one had been shot with a rubber bullet at point blank range, and another had been struck with a Taser three times as he was pinned down.

Over the next several days, protests over the shipments spread across Tacoma. Several more people were arrested or threatened with arrest. A legal observer was arrested for approaching a police officer to ask a question. A previous arrestee was again arrested at a Tacoma City Council meeting for speaking too long. And a PMR videographer, while filming legally, was ordered to turn off his camera or else it would be broken. Also, police instituted a ban on backpacks in the protest area, arresting one individual for defying the ban.

The night of Friday, March 9, not long after the USNS Soderman arrived, the next major incident of this round of port protests occurred. Demonstrators marched through the Port of Tacoma grounds until they came to a line of police, at which point they stopped and sat down. Protesters report that police then shot rubber bullets at them at point blank range and fired tear gas canisters at them as artillery.

On the afternoon of Sunday, March 11, Port Militarization Resistance organized a non-violent civil disobedience action. This action was coordinated with Tacoma police. The first wave involved 8 people bringing backpacks containing such items as the U.S. Constitution into the no-backpack zone. The second wave involved 15 people reading a Citizens' Injunction against the war, climbing over police barricades, and being subsequently soft-arrested.

Protesters returned to the Port of Tacoma tideflats on the evening of March 12. After a rally described "peaceful" by a Tacoma police detective, police began firing tear gas into the crowd of protesters, chasing them to the edge of the port grounds. Protesters had to negotiate with police to be allowed back on port grounds to retrieve their cars.

The USNS Soderman left early in the morning of March 13. Port Militarization Resistance organizers agreed to carry through with demonstrations they had already scheduled. The March 2007 Port of Tacoma protests concluded with a vigil the afternoon of March 15, in which a coffin was carried in a funeral march to the gate of the port quay. All told, 37 arrests were made.

Throughout the protests, PMR organizers made use of Internet media, especially the website YouTube. On some occasions, video of objectionable police behavior was viewable online only a few hours after it occurred. One video, "Film Is Not a Crime," was instrumental in inspiring the only internal investigation began by the Tacoma Police Department in regards to the protests.

The increased police presence cost the city of Tacoma an unbudgeted $500,000. The city is considering sending the bill for the extra security to the military.

The city of Tacoma has instructed its Citizen Review Panel to investigate allegations of police misconduct at the Port of Tacoma. Except for the "Film Is Not a Crime" incident, the city has said it will not investigate individual allegations of misconduct, citing police union contracts.

In the months after the March 2007 protests at the Port of Tacoma, PMR organizers claimed they had ended military shipments through the Port of Olympia, basing this conclusion on the fact that the military had chosen to go through the Port of Tacoma instead of the Port of Olympia. However, the Stryker shipments would return to the Port of Olympia a few months later.

== Port of Olympia – November 2007 ==
On November 5, 2007, the USNS Brittin arrived at the Port of Olympia, returning equipment from use in the Iraq War. This equipment, belonging to the 3rd Brigade 2nd Infantry Division, was the same equipment shipped out through the Port of Olympia in May 2006. Although Port Militarization Resistance had earlier said they would not obstruct the return of equipment, the group changed its mind in response to the shipment. PMR adopted a policy of "containment" of the equipment, citing health concerns and the wish to obstruct the refurbishment process.

Protests began on November 5, with a rally along the 4th Avenue Bridge, and a die-in at the Evergreen State College. Protests continued every day thereafter, and on many evenings.

The first arrests of protest participants were made Wednesday evening. Olympia police reported two demonstrators were arrested for attempting to block the convoys leaving the port grounds. Protest participants reported police used excessive force that evening. On the evening of November 8, another individual was arrested, this time for trespassing after he had successfully bluffed his way past the Port of Olympia security gate.

Beginning 3:00 pm on Friday, November 9, around 40 protesters established a human blockade of all traffic in and out of the port for the rest of the day and into Saturday. This traffic included at least two trucks with military equipment. One truck driver reportedly tried to push his way through the line of protesters, but was unable. Protesters began erecting physical barricades on the roads, using fences, signs, garbage bins and cinder blocks, in an attempt to continue the blockade of the port through the night. The Olympia police, citing lack of personnel, did not respond until the next morning.

At 9:45 am on Saturday, November 10, Olympia police began to clear the front gate of protesters. Police began deploying pepper spray, pushing people with batons, and at times even picked up and threw people out of the road. Activists reported police sprayed people directly in the eyes, and even removed protesters' goggles to do so. Reports indicate several bystanders were also hit with pepper spray for law-abiding behavior. Protest participants reported police covered their badge numbers, and taunted protesters as they deployed pepper spray. Police claim several warnings to disperse were given, citing their actions as their last resort.

Once the protest was broken up at the port gate, many participants took up similar tactics in intersections in downtown Olympia. Protesters clogged the intersection of 4th and Plum with dumpsters, cinder blocks, garbage cans, and newspaper boxes. Other intersections were similarly blocked as well. The debris was eventually cleared by Olympia police, and the trucks were able to reach the Interstate. During this time, several protesters locked down in PVC pipes at the onramp to Interstate 5. While the activists sat, locked down, Olympia police shot pepper balls at them. Police later sawed through the PVC pipes and cleared the road. 12 people were arrested.

Sunday, November 11, brought more pepper spray and three more arrests. Members of PMR attempted to lay flowers at the port gate in honor of the 48 soldiers from the Stryker division who had died during their deployment, but were shoved back with police batons. That evening, the Olympia City Council hosted a standing-room-only public forum on the police response to the protests.

On or around November 12, an unidentified individual poured concrete over the only rail line leading out of the Port of Olympia. An anonymous individual posted a warning of the concrete, recommending all rail traffic out of the port be suspended until the concrete is removed. Olympia police report the concrete was cleaned up without incident.

At 9:00 am on Tuesday, November 13, convoys attempted to resume leaving the port grounds. A truck carrying military equipment, attempting to elude waiting protesters, drove so close behind another truck with non-military cargo that it nearly rear-ended it. Demonstrators were still able to obstruct the truck, and it was forced to return to the port grounds. Demonstrators maintained this road blockade throughout the day.

That evening, the blockade was maintained by the Women's Caucus of Port Militarization Resistance. While 39 women maintained the roadblock, men in PMR reportedly defended them from verbal assaults from counter-demonstrators. During this blockade, one soldier assigned to drive the convoys refused to do so, and asked demonstrators to drive him back to Fort Lewis.

When police arrived to break up the blockade that evening, they began by pulling participants away one by one, but then began to use pepper spray to force the crowd to disperse. Reports also indicate two concussion grenades were thrown into the crowd. 43 protesters were arrested.

Once the protest at the port gate was dispersed, protesters again took their efforts to downtown Olympia. Protesters again attempted to blockade the convoys in downtown with dumpsters and newspaper boxes. Some participants threw rocks through windows of police cars and banks. One police officer was struck in the knee with a rock by a protester.

No convoys left the port on November 14. The final trucks left the port on November 15. 5 more demonstrators were arrested that day, and several others were pepper sprayed. PMR concluded the evening with a 100-person candlelight vigil in downtown Olympia. The final event of the protests was a 350-person march through downtown Olympia on November 17. Rail cars containing the final equipment from the shipment left the port on November 28 without further incident.

A total of 66 people were arrested during the November 2007 round of Port of Olympia protests. The cost to the city for security during this round of port protests was estimated to be at least $112,168. City Manager Steve Hall suggested the bill be sent to the Port of Olympia.

There was a notable anarchist presence in the November 2007 Port of Olympia protests. Several people report seeing black bloc marches go through downtown Olympia, the first on the evening of November 5. Further, some anarchist participants in the November 2007 protests at the Port of Olympia, while employing the strategy of Port Militarization Resistance, chose instead to identify with the name Port Liberation Front (A play on the name Earth Liberation Front). In statements posted online, the PLF criticizes PMR for its commitment to non-violence, and for what it claims is its support for "legal wars" like the Invasion of Afghanistan. PLF members cite decentralization as necessary for the achieving of port militarization resistance goals, while also stressing the need for involved parties to find "basic common ground in which they could operate together". Various PLF statements have taken credit or partial credit for many actions during the protests, including physical barricades both at the port and in downtown Olympia. There is no evidence of any anarchist or PLF participation in events or actions organized by PMR the movement.

Olympia police have come under both praise and criticism for their response to the November 2007 Port of Olympia protests. Protesters have criticized police for deploying pepper spray on broad swaths of bystanders and on protesters passively failing to comply with orders, in violation of guidelines that say pepper spray should only be used to subdue violent resisters. Police have also been criticized by community members for moving beyond individual arrest into a strategy of group punishment. Others have expressed support for the police, and suggested the blame for the confrontations lies with the protesters.

Several reporters from local newspaper The Olympian were victims of attacks by police while attempting to cover the protests, one of whom was reportedly treated by protest medics. The newspaper later came under criticism when an editor wrote an editorial disavowing these events had happened.

== Other actions/Related actions ==
While being most noted for the protests at the Port of Olympia and Port of Tacoma, Port Militarization Resistance has been involved in or associated with other less noted port protests.

=== Port of Grays Harbor – May 2007 ===
On May 1, 2007, Fort Lewis began shipping equipment from the 4th Squadron, 6th U.S. Air Cavalry Regiment, to the Port of Grays Harbor in Aberdeen, Washington, to be shipped to Iraq. This was the first time the military used the Port of Grays Harbor for shipments. Despite the intensity of the protests at the Port of Tacoma two months earlier, only a couple daytime protests materialized during this shipment.

The added security during the Port of Grays Harbor protests cost the city $165,000. The military has refused to cover this bill, claiming that "it wasn't the military that required the security."

=== Port of Oakland – May 2007 ===
On May 19, 2007, anti-war activists in Oakland maintained a picket line outside the gates of the Port of Oakland during a shipment of war materials. The local ILWU chose not to cross this picket line, and thus the shipment was delayed for several days.

The event was organized by the Port Action Committee of Oakland, which comprises many of the people who organized the port protests at that port in April 2003. Although this was unaffiliated with Port Militarization Resistance, organizers cited PMR as an inspiration.

== Court cases ==
Due to the high number of arrests at Port Militarization Resistance protests, several criminal cases were pursued by local jurisdictions against protest participants.

=== Olympia 22 ===
The most publicized court case to come from Port Militarization Resistance actions involved 16 of the 22 people arrested at the Port of Olympia on May 30, 2006. Despite that some defendants were severed from the case, PMR organizers continued to refer to the remaining defendants as the Olympia 22.

The Olympia 22 case got national headlines when the judge denied a prosecution motion to suppress discussion of the war. This gave the defense the ability to use the necessity defense, to argue in court that their actions, though they may have been illegal, were necessary to stop a greater crime. While this defense was used many times in the Vietnam War era to win acquittals in cases where defendants had clearly done what they were accused of, this would have been the first such attempt to use the necessity defense in regards to the Iraq War. However, the decision was later overturned on appeal, and the necessity defense was never brought before a jury.

The first trial of the sixteen Olympia 22 defendants, which began on March 26, 2007, ended in mistrial on its fourth day, when an individual identifying himself as being with Homeland Security furnished a printout of an e-mail from a confidential riseup e-mail list of attorneys and defendants. This e-mail contained a spreadsheet with confidential juror information. The prosecution, characterizing the information as being "out there" on the Internet, successfully argued for a mistrial. Defendants maintain the list constituted attorney-client protected discussions.

While preparing to retry the case through three split trials, the charges were dismissed with prejudice on June 12, 2007. The judge cited "gross negligence" on the part of the prosecution, in failing to provide new discovery to the defendants in a timely manner before trial. Local newspaper The Olympian editorialized that the prosecution blew the case by not pursuing it aggressively enough.

=== Other court cases ===
There were several other court cases to come from each of PMR's protests. Many charges were dismissed, and some were acquitted, while other protest participants were convicted on their charges.

== Public reaction and impact ==
Port Militarization Resistance actions garnered international attention, with coverage from The New York Times, the BBC, Democracy Now!, and Air America Radio.

=== Support ===
Many anti-war activists cited the port protests as being inspirational. Among them, 1st Lt Ehren Watada cited the May 2006 PMR protests as inspiration for his decision to publicly refuse to deploy with the 3rd Brigade, 2nd Infantry Division. During the May 2006 protests at the Port of Olympia, author Ron Jacobs called for "One, Two, Three, Many Olympias." PMR also gained the support of international organizations, like the Japan Peace Committee.

PMR also frequently cited messages of support they received from active-duty soldiers.

=== PMR Spied on by US Military ===
On July 22, 2009 a man named John Towery was publicly outed for infiltrating and spying on PMR and anarchists over a period of at least two years. This information was discovered through documents received from the City of Olympia through a public records request. Towery, who was known by activists as "John Jacob", was active in PMR and frequented the Tacoma anarchist community space Pitch Pipe Infoshop. After he was outed he admitted to two anarchists that he did in fact spy on them for two years. He worked as an informant for a force protection unit in the Army. Other records showed that numerous police agencies, federal agencies and every branch of the US military was involved with spying on, and in some cases infiltrating, PMR. Democracy Now!, The New York Times and countless other national and international media outlets covered the story. PMR activists and anarchists are currently involved in a lawsuit against the Army, Air Force, Coast Guard, Olympia Police Department, Tacoma Police Department, Thurston County Sheriffs and Pierce County Sheriffs for violating civil rights, civil liberties and the Posse Comitatus Act.

=== Criticism ===
Port Militarization Resistance also came under scrutiny, both for its uncompromising stance and for its choice of tactics. One of PMR's more prolific critics was conservative columnist Michelle Malkin. Malkin criticized PMR's actions as putting U.S. servicepeople in danger, and accused PMR members of sedition.

One point of criticism levied at PMR during the November 2007 protests at the Port of Olympia involved the participation of children in situations where police were likely to deploy crowd control weapons. Critics of PMR suggested it was reckless of protest participants to put children in danger. PMR supporters contended that they were not responsible for the police response, and suggested that children should have the right to participate in the protests. Another frequent point of criticism of PMR involved the choice to engage in tactics that are disapproved by more moderate anti-war allies and elected officials.

== See also ==
- Fusion center
- List of anti-war organizations
- List of peace activists
