= List of schools in Iraq =

This is a list of primary schools and secondary schools in the Asian country of Iraq.

== Baghdad ==
Schools in the city of Baghdad, Baghdad Governorate, include:

- Al-Adel Elementary School – kindergarten and elementary; grades 1– 6
- Al-Eelaf high school for Girls
- Al-Ameen High School for Girls
- Al Aqida - Al Rahibat High School for Girls
- Al-Bohtry Primary School
- Al-Forat High School for Boys
- Al Hariri High School – girls' school
- Al-I'tizaz Secondary School for Girls
- Al. Jumouriea Secondary High School for Boys
- Al. Jumouriea Secondary High School for Girls
- Al-Kansaa Secondary School for Girls
- Al-Mansour High School for Boys – one of the largest secondary schools (junior high: 900 students; and high school: 1,000 students); bilingual (English, French); optional trade courses; established 1967
- Al-Mohopeen High School for Boys – Al-Khadhraa
- Al-Mustafa High school for Distinguished Boys - Al-Saydia
- Al-Bayariq High School for Mixed students- Tarmiyah
- Al-maarif school formerly known for teaching Arabic, English, and Turkish.
- Al-Mutamaizat High School for Girls – al-Karkh, al-Khadraa
- Al-Mutamaizat High School R1 for Girls
- Al-Mutamaizat High School R2 for Girls
- Al-Mutamaizeen High School for Boys – al Harthiya
- Al-Mutamaizeen High School for Boys – al-Karkh, al-Khadraa
- Al-Mutamaizeen High School R1 for Boys
- Al-Mutamaizeen High School R2 for Boys
- Al Mutamayizeen Secondary
- Al. Nazaha Secondary High School for Girls
- Al-Nizamiyah High School School for Boys
- Al-Risala Preparatory School for Boys – Al-Qahira
- Al-Salam school for distinguished girls
- Al-Sharqiya High School for Boys
- Al-Sharqiya High School for Girls
- Al-Syiaddah Al-wataneyya Elementary School – grades 1–6
- Al-Tamim High School for Boys
- Amil High School for Girls
- Baquba High School
- Baghdad College – secondary school for boys
- Baghdad High School for Girls – formerly known as the American High School for Girls
- Cadmus International School
- Damascus Primary School for Girls and Boys
- Iraq School - KG 1-2 and grades 1-6
- Ishik School - co-educational
- Markaziyah High School - is the oldest and most renowned high school in Iraq.
- The Gifted Students' School – co-educational secondary school
- Thalathoon Tammooz High School for Girls
- Tigris Secondary School for Girls

== Baquba ==
Schools in the city of Baquba, Diyala Governorate, include:

- Al-Maarif High School for Boys
- Al-Adnaniah High School for Girls
- Al-Edadia Al-Markazia High School for Boys
- Al-Huria High School for Girls
- Al-Jawahery High School for Boys
- Al-Najaf Al-Ashraf High School for Boys
- Al-Sharif Al-Radhi High School for Boys
- Aysha High School for Girls
- Um-Salamah High School for Girls

== Basrah ==
Schools in the city of Basrah, Basrah Governorate, include:

- Al-Ashaar High School for Girls
- Al-Rafidain Private Schools
- Al-Markazya – Boys' secondary school
- Al-Mutamaizat High School for Girls
- Al-Mutamaizeen High School for Boys
- Al-Thakafa al-Arabia – elementary school
- Anbariyn School – in a Shi'ite quarter; has 1,500 pupils; attended by boys in the morning and girls in the afternoon
- Basrah Ishik Schools
- Basrah Ishik Kindergarten
- Basrah Ishik Al Zaytoon Campus
- Basrah Ishik Al Qibla Campus
- Khalisa Girls School – established in the 1930s
- Mawtani Private School

== Erbil ==
Schools in the city of Erbil, Erbil Governorate, include:

- Barz Private school
- British International Schools in Kurdistan- Hawler
- Canadian International School
- Chueifat International School
- Classical School of the Medes
- Faxir Mergasory Public School
- French International School
- Hawler Private School
- Ishik Ronaky School
- International School of Choueifat Erbil
- Italian City 2 School
- Kurdistan High School
- Mar Qardakh school
- Rozak Public School
- Shkodar Public School
- Zhyar Private School

== Mosul ==
Schools in the city of Mosul, Nineveh Governorate, include:

- Al-Mouhobeen Secondary School for Boys and Girls
- Al-Mustaqbal High School for Boys
- Al-Mutamaizat High School for Girls
- Al-Mutamaizeen High School for Boys
- Al-Resalah Al-Islamia (Al-Resalah) High School for Boys
- Al-Sharqiya High School for Boys
- Kourtoba High School for Girls

== Sulaymaniyah ==
Schools in the city of Sulaymaniyah, Sulaymaniyah Governorate, include:

- AISS American International School of Sulaimani
- Azmar College For Gifted Students
- Azmar High School
- Dwarozh Private School
- French International School MLF Danielle Mitterrand
- The International School of Choueifat
- Junior Private School – English basic school
- Salahadin High school for Boys
- Shaheed Jabar Exemplary High School

== Zakho ==
Schools in the city of Zakho, Dohuk Governorate, include:

- British International School Zakho – EYFS and Y1-Y10; britishinternationalschoolzakho.com

== See also ==
- Education in Iraq
- Lists of schools
