= Investment in post-invasion Iraq =

Efforts to rebuild Iraqi infrastructure since the Iraq War

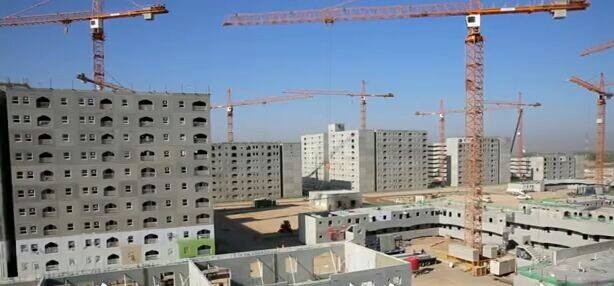
Construction of Bismayah New City near Baghdad in Diyala Governorate, Iraq

Investment in post-invasion Iraq refers to efforts to rebuild the infrastructure of Iraq since the US invasion of Iraq in 2003. The responsibility of the reconstruction of the country immediately after the invasion fell on the US-led occupation authorities. The US effort to rebuild the country during the occupation was considered a failure. Since the end of the occupation it has been the responsibility of the government of Iraq to rebuild the country which, as of 2026, has experienced significant development.

During the occupation of Iraq, along with the economic reform of Iraq, international projects were implemented to repair and upgrade Iraqi water and sewage treatment plants, electricity production, hospitals, schools, housing, and transportation systems. Much of the work during the occupation of the country was supposed to be funded by the Iraq Relief and Reconstruction Fund, and the Coalition Provisional Authority.

A significant event for aid or investment in post-2003 Iraq was the Madrid Conference on Reconstruction on 23 October 2003, which was attended by representatives from over 25 nations. The administration of funds assembled at this conference and from other sources fell on the United Nations and the World Bank under the umbrella of the International Reconstruction Fund Facility for Iraq.

While reconstruction efforts during the US occupation produced some successes, problems arose with the implementation of internationally funded Iraq reconstruction efforts. These included poor administration on the part of the US occupation authorities, inadequate security, pervasive corruption, insufficient funding and poor coordination among international agencies and local communities. Many suggested that the efforts were hampered by a poor understanding of Iraq on the part of the international community assisting with the reconstruction.

After the occupation of Iraq, the Iraqi government has been independently rebuilding the country through economic initiatives and large-scale reconstruction efforts, such as the Grand Faw Port.

== Pre-2003 status of Iraq infrastructure ==
During the 1970s Iraq made extensive investment in the water sector and other infrastructure using the proceeds of oil revenue. This investment slowed during the Iran-Iraq War of 1980 to 1988, but left Iraq in 1990 with a relatively modern electrical, water supply and sewerage system. During the Gulf War of 1991 aerial bombardment caused severe damage to the electric grid that operated the pumping stations and other facilities for potable water delivery and sewage treatment. The sanctions imposed by the UN at the conclusion of the Gulf War exacerbated these problems by banning the importation of spare parts for equipment and chemicals, such as chlorine, needed for disinfection. As a result of the war and sanctions, delivery of water dropped precipitously. For example, UNICEF estimates that before 1991, 95% of urban dwellers and 75% of rural dwellers were served by modern water supply systems that delivered treated water to homes and businesses. By 1999, urban coverage had dropped to 92% and rural coverage to 46%. Individual water availability showed greater changes. Between 1990 and 2000, the daily per capita share of potable water went from 330 litres to 150 litres in Baghdad, 270 to 110 in other urban areas, and 180 to 65 in rural areas.

The March 2003 invasion of Iraq produced further degradation of Iraq's water supply, sewerage and electrical supply systems. Treatment plants, pumping stations and generating stations were stripped of their equipment, supplies and electrical wiring by looters. The once-capable cadre of engineers and operating technicians were scattered or left the country. Reconstruction efforts faced a nation with a severely degraded infrastructure.

== Assessing reconstruction needs ==
In preparation for the October 2003 Madrid Donor Conference, the joint United Nations/World Bank team conducted an assessment of funding needs for reconstruction in Iraq during the period 2004-2007. The resulting report identified 14 sectors and associated funding needs as shown in the Table below. In addition to this US$36 billion, the Coalition Provisional Authority estimated an additional US$20 billion in need including US$5 billion for security and police and US$8 billion for oil industry infrastructure.

Sector	Needs (US$billion)
Government Institutions	0.39
Education	4.81
Health	1.60
Employment creation	0.79
Transport and telecommunications	3.41
Water, sanitation, solid waste	6.84
Electricity	12.12
Urban Management	0.41
Housing and Land Management	1.42
Agriculture and Water Resources	3.03
State-Owned Enterprises	0.36
Financial Sector	0.081
Investment Climate	0.34
Mine Action	0.23
Total	35.82

In 2007 the Government of Iraq and the United Nations created the International Compact with Iraq a visioning and planning entity which identified reconstruction as an essential element for meeting human needs and economic development.

== US administration of Iraq reconstruction ==
During the US occupation of Iraq, reconstruction efforts were plagued by poor management, mishandling of reconstruction funds, inadequate coordination with Iraqis and widespread attacks on construction sites and contractors as documented by the Office of the Special Inspector General for Iraq Reconstruction (SIGIR).

Funds for Iraq reconstruction were disbursed to Iraqi ministries, non-Iraqi government agencies and various non-governmental groups. These entities then supervised the acquisition of materials and reconstruction work which is conducted by both foreign and Iraqi contractors.

Funds held by the United Nations Development Group were disbursed through United Nations agencies such as the World Health Organization, UNICEF and the UN Development Program. These UN agencies directly contracted with equipment suppliers and construction companies. Disbursement of funds by the UN began in June 2004. Funds held by the World Bank are disbursed directly to Iraqi government agencies including the Municipality of Baghdad and national ministries. Granting of funds to Iraqi agencies began in December 2004.

A series of US agencies have managed funds held by the US-operated Iraq Relief and Reconstruction Fund. Beginning in May 2003, the Coalition Provisional Authority (CPA) began oversight of reconstruction efforts in Iraq. Within the CPA the Project Management Office (PMO) was created to manage reconstruction projects. Both the CPA and PMO were divisions of the US Department of Defense. On June 28, 2004, the CPA was dissolved and the Iraqi interim government took power. At this time, the management of reconstruction projects was transferred to the Iraq Reconstruction and Management Office (IRMO), a division of the US Department of State, and the Project and Contracting Office (PCO), a division of the Department of Defense, both under the oversight of the US State Department Mission to Baghdad. On December 4, 2005 the PCO was merged with the US Army Corps of Engineers, Gulf Region Division. Since October 2004, contracting support for Iraq reconstruction was also provided by the Joint Contracting Command-Iraq/Afghanistan. Other U.S. Government agencies, including the U.S. Agency for International Development (USAID) and the State Department, have also issued contracts funded by the Iraq Relief and Reconstruction Fund.

Funds from the US-operated IRRF are largely disbursed through contracts to private firms. Several US companies have been particularly prominent in receiving Iraq reconstruction funds. Bechtel of San Francisco, USA was awarded over $2.4 billion for infrastructure rehabilitation through USAID contracts. Flour AMEC, LLC, Greenville, South Carolina, USA was awarded nearly $1 billion for water, sewer of solid waste management systems. Parsons Corporation of Pasadena, California was awarded $1.3 billion for construction services. Washington Group International of Boise, Idaho, USA received awards of $580 million for water resource reconstruction projects. Kellogg, Brown and Root (KBR), a subsidiary of Halliburton of Houston, Texas received awards of $580 million. Another $1.2 billion has been distributed to Iraqi contractors. In 2005/2006 Symbion Power of the US were awarded $250 million of competitively bid new fixed price electrical infrastructure work throughout the country. Symbion Power is a privately owned engineering firm with an ownership structure that involves a security company Hart Security. The dollar figures provided here are that of July 2006.

=== Progress of Iraq reconstruction ===
In October, 2004, the U.S. Congress created SIGIR which was charged with oversight of the use and potential misuse of the IRRF. The SIGIR conducts audits, investigations and inspections and issues quarterly reports to Congress. The SIGIR reports and U.S. Congressional testimony of Stuart Bowen, the Inspector General, were a primary source of information on U.S. funded Iraq reconstruction's overall status. The rate of disbursement of funds administered by the United Nations and World Bank was slow. Iraqi agencies and ministries were often unable to receive or process funds. Many United Nations agencies had great difficulty operating in Iraq due to the poor security situation.

=== Reprogramming reconstruction funds ===
The original allocation of IRRF funds to the various sectors has undergone a series of reassignments. These allocation changes occurred in September and December, 2004 and March and December, 2005 and generally involved shifting money from water resources and sanitation and electricity sectors to meet security needs and to provide training and operating funds for facilities already rehabilitated under IRRF funding. The table below shows the changes that occurred in allocations (billions of $US) between September 2004 and December 2005. While the administrative expenses are listed as separate category, an additional $0.60 billion, spread across sectors, was spent on administrative costs in fiscal years 2004 and 2005.

Sector	Allocation Prior to 30 September 2004	Allocation as of 31 December 2005
Electricity	5.46	4.22
Water Resources and Sanitation	4.25	2.13
Security and Law Enforcement	3.24	5.04
Justice, Public Safety Infrastructure and Civil Society	1.48	2.35
Private Sector Development	0.18	0.45
Iraq Debt Forgiveness	0.00	0.35
Oil Infrastructure	1.70	1.74
Health Care	0.79	0.74
Transportation and Telecommunication	0.50	0.47
Education, Refugees and Human Rights	0.26	0.41
Roads, Bridges and Construction	0.37	0.33
Administrative	0.21	0.21
Total	18.44	18.44

=== Reconstruction gap ===
In October, 2005 the SIGIR introduced the concept of the "reconstruction gap" which was defined as the difference between the reconstruction planned and that which is actually delivered. In February 2006, the SIGIR reported that only 36% of water sector projects originally planned will be completed and only 70% of the originally-planned electricity sector projects will be completed. This shortfall was attributed to IRRF reprogramming of funds from these sectors to meet security needs, poor cost estimates in the original reconstruction plan, increased material costs and lack of administrative oversight. Estimates of the funds required to close the reconstruction gap were difficult to obtain because there was inadequate information on the cost-to-complete projects already in progress at the time. In addition to funds for reconstruction, SIGIR recommended that funds be allocated to sustain the reconstructed infrastructure. Without funding for supplies, technicians and fuel, the facilities that were completed may fall into disuse.

=== Security of international aid workers ===
International NGOs (INGOs) had found operating in Iraq highly dangerous to their staff, as between March 2003 and March 2008 94 aid workers were killed, 248 injured, 24 arrested or detained and 89 kidnapped or abducted. This led to INGOs to either completely unwind their operations, or else go undercover and try to make their activities as low profile as possible. INGOs were not treated as neutral parties by large sections of the population due to their beginning operations alongside the invasion and receiving security and funding from the multinational force and the governments that it consists of. The security situation also led to much of the management of aid programmes to take place abroad, thus lowering the effectiveness of the programmes and creating a fragmented response. Researchers at the Overseas Development Institute discussed the importance of using local organisations and also understanding the violence not a single insurmountable challenge, but understanding various acts of violence more individually, sharing the knowledge between agencies and responding more appropriately - the formation of the NGO Coordination Committee in Iraq was a step in this direction.

=== Attacks on construction activities ===
Attacks, murders, bombings and armed vandalism were routine threats to reconstruction contractors. Since reconstruction began in March 2003 and as of July 30, 2009, at least 1395 workers on U.S. funded projects have died according to the U.S. Departments of Labor and State. The table below shows the number of worker deaths in each quarter starting with the first reporting by SIGIR. In addition, there were thousands of insurance claims by construction workers for injuries sustained in attacks. The figures were probably mis-reported, especially among Iraqi contractors. Intimidation of workers delayed projects and reduced the availability of non-Iraqi expert technicians. It is estimated that 25% of reconstruction funds were used to provide security to construction workers and job sites.

Attacks and vandalism also affected completed projects including sabotage of oil pipelines and high-voltage electricity towers. However, the Commander of the Multi-National Force-Iraq, General David Petraeus, announced in May, 2008 that oil and electricity production exceeded pre-war levels as the "surge" and enlistment of local Iraqis in security forces has brought calm to many areas of the nation.

Year	Quarter 1	Quarter 2	Quarter 3	Quarter 4
2004	NA	NA	22	112
2005	44	54	85	52
2006	52	59	91	101
2007	152	79	72	43
2008	58	48	33	35
2009	57	29	?	?

=== Corruption ===
It has been alleged that large amounts of American tax dollars and seized Iraqi revenues were lost by the Coalition Provisional Authority (CPA). One audit put the total number as high as $8.8 billion. Fraudulent contractors such as Philip Bloom often bribed CPA officials in exchange for contracts that were never performed. An article in the New York Times describes "irregularities including millions of reconstruction dollars stuffed casually into footlockers and filing cabinets, an American soldier in the Philippines who gambled away cash belonging to Iraq, and three Iraqis who plunged to their deaths in a rebuilt hospital elevator that had been improperly certified as safe." While the US government has begun the process of prosecuting contractors that stole American tax dollars, the Iraqi government currently has no means of reacquiring Iraqi assets that were stolen by US contractors. This is partially due to a decree passed by the CPA that gives civilian contractors in Iraq immunity from all Iraqi jurisdiction.

As part of reconstruction, no-bid contracts were awarded to large American corporations including Halliburton and Bechtel. In particular, Halliburton has been singled out for receiving what is perceived to be government favoritism for doing a shoddy job of rebuilding Iraq's oil infrastructure. When the Pentagon's own auditors determined that about $263 million of a Halliburton subsidiary's costs were potentially excessive, the Army still paid the company all but $10.1 million of the disputed costs. Bechtel Corp. became the first major U.S. contractor to announce that it was pulling out of Iraq in Fall 2006.

Some say that the reconstruction would have been both much more efficient and inexpensive if more contracts were granted to local Iraqi firms, many of whom were shut out of the process due to the fact that they were state-owned. Congressman Henry Waxman was once told by members of the Iraqi governing council that paying Iraqi companies to rebuild Iraq instead of American ones would save American tax payers 90% of the costs.

By Summer of 2008, oil and electricity levels returned to pre-invasion (i.e. pre-March, 2003) levels.

In 2012 the International Consortium of Investigative Journalists reported that in the prior two years 70 American individuals and companies had won up to USD8 billion in contracts for post-war Iraq and Afghanistan, all of which donated to the successful presidential campaigns of US former president George W. Bush and were led by Dick Cheney before he was picked as Bush's running mate and subsequently elected vice president.

== Assessment ==
The United States Special Inspector General along with many Iraqi leaders judged the program undertaken by the occupation authority to be a failure.

=== Electricity ===
General Petraeus noted in May, 2008 that electricity levels had exceeded pre-war production; however, this statistic is misleading. The estimated hours per day of electricity availability has shifted. During the Saddam rule, Baghdad received electricity for between 16 and 24 hours per day with 4 to 8 hours received outside of the capital. Information from the Brookings Institution (early 2007) indicates that Baghdad now receives electricity from 4 to 8 hours per day with the remainder of the nation receiving from 8 to 12 hours of electricity per day. Current electricity levels of about 4,000 MW have not yet reached the stated goal of nationwide production of 6000 MW.

Much of the efforts to rebuild Iraq's electrical infrastructure had been largely dependent on the repair and construction of transmission lines and substations by global engineering firms willing to work in hostile territories.

=== Food and humanitarian aid ===
In relation to food and humanitarian aid, Iraq seems to have underscored in different ways. The Office of Reconstruction and Humanitarian Assistance (OHRA) was for example, established with the aim of restoring the basic services with in the Iraqi people. Very little was achieved however, in relation to the socio-economic rehabilitation. Iraqi people have sustained much more suffering prior to the invasion.

In May 2006, the United Nations World Food Programme (WFP) concluded its most recent food security survey.

It found that 15 percent of the total Iraqi population (just over 4 million people) is food insecure and in dire need of different types of humanitarian assistance, including food, despite the rations they are receiving from the Public Distribution System (PDS). This is an increase from the estimated 11 percent (2.6 million people) deemed to be extremely poor in WFP's first survey in September 2004. The May 2006 survey also indicated that a further 8.3 million people would be rendered food insecure if they were not provided with a PDS ration, compared to 3.6 million people in the previous survey. An earlier survey, conducted in July 2005, found that acute malnutrition rates for children was nine percent overall, but with rates for children between 6 and 12 months old reaching 13 percent and 12 percent for those aged between one and two years.

In 2007, the WFP provided emergency food provisions to about 1.1 million Iraqis. WFP has assisted in the establishment of a Food Security Unit, located in the Iraq Ministry of Planning and Development Cooperation, which collects food security information. The PDS was a major contributor in stabilizing the food supply in Iraq. For the poor and food insecure, the PDS represented by far the single most important food source in their diet.

=== Water, sanitation and solid waste ===
In January 2007, IRRF funded projects resulted in the construction or rehabilitation of 21 potable water treatment facilities and 200 smaller water systems. Major projects included the Nassriya Water Treatment Plant which will produce 240,000 cubic meters per day. A new water canal to supply clean water to Basrah and Thi Qar was completed in April 2006. These projects provided capacity to supply water to approximately 5.4 million people (1.67 million cubic meters per day). This compares with the target capacity, at the completion of all IRRF funded water projects, of 2.37 million cubic meters per day needed to provide for 8.4 million people. The water that actually reached Iraqi citizens was difficult to determine because of significant water losses in the distribution systems.

A modern landfill, built to international environmental standards, was planned for southwest Baghdad, with the capacity to handle 2,230 cubic meters of waste per day. The construction was halted prior to completion in November 2005, due to security concerns. There has been some limited utilization of the landfill, however full utilization has not yet been implemented.

Reports on waste collection, at the time noted that being a garbage collector may be one of the most dangerous jobs in Iraq. Most of the 500 municipal workers in Baghdad who were killed were waste collectors. There were inadequate waste collection vehicles with only 380 presently in service. Before the invasion there were 1200 working trucks. Most of the vehicles were destroyed or lost in the looting that seized the capital after the American invasion. The deputy mayor of Baghdad estimated the city needs 1,500 waste collection vehicles.

=== Oil ===
Before the 2003 invasion, Iraqi crude oil production was about 2.5 million barrels per day (400,000 m^{3}/d) (BPD). In 2006 Iraqi crude oil production averaged 2.12 million BPD. In mid-2006, the Iraqi oil minister, said that "he expected output to rise to approximately 4 m BPD by 2010, increasing to 6 m BPD by 2012."

The situation was characterized by some Oil Ministry officials as chaotic, with one official stating "We do not know the exact quantity of oil we are exporting, we do not exactly know the prices we are selling it for, and we do not know where the oil revenue is going to."

In Summer 2008, the nation's Parliament still had not produced a comprehensive "hydrocarbon law" (oil law) apportioning revenue between local governorates and the central government. While oil production in early 2008 exceeded pre-war levels and continued to climb, disagreements remained among oil-rich regions, oil-poor regions, and the national government over contracting rights and revenue-sharing.

=== Healthcare ===
Until the early 1990s, Iraq's healthcare system was considered one of the most advanced in the Middle East. Following the Gulf War, it began to deteriorate. Prior to the Iraq War, healthcare spending amounted to 50 cents (US) per Iraqi per year. Today, the Iraqi healthcare system has regressed to a chronic and smoldering condition. Infections are widespread, the infant mortality rate has surged, and medical shortages all threaten the once functioning medical system. US based NGO, Giving Children Hope, had a healthcare development program in Iraq that equipped hospitals and clinics with needed supplies and equipment in conjunction with the US military.

However, the situation in Iraqi Kurdistan was quite different at the time. Due to their better stability as well as relative autonomy, the Kurdistan region enjoyed health care situation differed to that under Saddam. Health workers had not left the provinces for neighboring counties, as they had in other parts of Iraq, and new programs for continuing professional education in major Iraqi Kurdish cities reflected the optimism of the area.

With the primarily Sunni Al Anbar governorate to the west experiencing increased stability due to the U.S. troop surge and the Sunni rejection of Al Qaeda in Iraq, International Health analysts hoped to see improved health care there, as well. It remained to be seen whether non-governmental organizations and the Shiite-dominated central Iraqi government would take advantage of the enhanced security to enact sustainable services and other improvements. Local initiatives in June 2008 included contracting with the International Medical Corps for a comprehensive Anbar continuing medical education program, rights of return for expatriate health professionals, and an overhaul of nursing, with innovative programs paralleling the "diploma" nursing track of the West, and a goal of attracting women to nursing as a career (70% of Iraqi nurses were male).

Until late 2007, the Ministry of Health had been apportioned by the new Shiite majority to politicians aligned with Moqtada Al Sadr, a minority Shiite party leader and head of a sect prominent in East Baghdad slums. Allegations abounded of abductions of Sunni patients, and Iraqi Security Force (Army and Police) patients, from their hospital beds. The Inspector General was prosecuted for corruption, and the Facilities Protective Service (FPS) commander was dismissed for running a Mafia-like organization, contributing weapons and manpower to terrorist and other gangs.

At the close of 2007, a new Minister of Health, Salih al-Hasnawi, was appointed and began ministerial reforms. The Inspector General was replaced and a new openness was encouraged. In June, 2008, the Minister of Health convened a National Strategic Planning Conference in Baghdad. At this conference, attended by professionals, NGOs and Provincial Reconstruction Teams from all over Iraq, he announced that Iraq would direct its own health reconstruction, funding it with Iraqi money according to Iraqi priorities. Although there is still a place for external expert advice, the determination of the Iraqis to direct their own health development was clear.

There were sparse data on the role of private practice in Iraq. Estimates range as high as 70% of outpatient visits, compared to approximately 30% before the war. Iraq has included health care as a constitutional right; as government-sponsored care becomes more accessible, the future of private practice will likely change, but it is an ingrained feature of the Iraqi healthcare fabric.

=== Postal code system ===
In 1991 and 2003, Iraq developed a postal code system which was not widely utilized. Both attempts tried to identify the street or delivery address, along with the province and post office. Unfortunately, both of these attempts had built-in limitations that would not allow for expansion and were much more complex than necessary.

In 2004, Iraq's Postmaster General, Mr. Ibraheem Hussien Ali, and CPA/MoC postal advisors initiated an effort to correct and modernize the Iraqi postal code system.

== Iraqi administration of reconstruction ==
=== Private sector development ===
In late 2009, a construction plan was proposed to rebuild the heart of Baghdad, but the plan was never realized because corruption was involved in it. The Baghdad Eye Ferris wheel, proposed in August 2008, was installed at the Al-Zawraa Park in March 2011. In May 2010, a new large scale residential and commercial project called Baghdad Gate was announced. In August 2010, Iraqi-British architect Zaha Hadid, was appointed to design a new headquarters for the Central Bank in Baghdad. Initial talks about the project were held in Istanbul, Turkey, on 14 August 2010, in the presence of the bank governor Sinan al-Shabibi. On 2 February 2012, Hadid joined Sinan al-Shabibi at a ceremony in London to sign the agreement between the bank and her firm for the design stages of the new building. The construction was postponed in 2015 due to economical problems, but started again in 2019. Since the end of the war, Baghdad has experienced improvement in the private sector, with launch of modern trends such as startups and incubation centers.

==== Baghdad Sustainable Forests ====
‘’‘Baghdad Sustainable Forests’’’ is a large-scale ecological development project in Baghdad, Iraq, aimed at transforming over 10 million square meters of land into a sustainable urban forest. The project is a collaboration between the architectural firm Gensler and the development company Emkanat, with support from the Government of Iraq, the Prime Minister’s Office, Baghdad Municipality, and the National Investment Commission.

The site of the project was formerly the Al-Rasheed military camp, which had been neglected and contained over 45 million metric tons of waste. The initiative seeks to rehabilitate this land, turning it into a model of urban resilience and environmental restoration.

The master plan envisions a series of thematic forests, each serving different purposes: Arts and Culture Forest, Health and Wellness Forest, Kids and Entertainment Forest, Sports and Fitness Forest, Ladies Forest.

In total, there are 28 themed forests planned, designed to promote creativity, well-being, and community engagement.

The development includes over 1.5 million square meters of retail, commercial, and amenity infrastructure, featuring walkable mixed-use hubs to support a growing urban population.

The project plans to plant one million trees, which are expected to capture approximately 22,000 metric tons of CO₂ annually. These trees will be interspersed among tranquil trails and vibrant civic plazas, contributing to improved air quality and microclimate regulation.

The development is projected to generate around 80,000 jobs, fostering inclusive growth and rebuilding community ties. It aims to attract investment and celebrate Baghdad’s rich heritage as a center of creativity and exchange.

The project aligns with Iraq’s 2023–2030 National Environmental Strategy, addressing contemporary ecological challenges. It has received an investment license and is being implemented under the patronage of the Government of Iraq and in close collaboration with the Baghdad Municipality and the National Investment Commission.

=== US interference and lobbying ===
There have been reports of pressure from the US government on the Iraqi administration regarding the latter's public procurement bids. In April 2019 German conglomerate Siemens was on the verge to win a USD 14 billion contract to rebuild Iraq's war-damaged infrastructure, according to then prime minister Adel Abdul Mahdi, which reportedly angered Siemens rival, American conglomerate General Electric and caused the Trump administration to lobby for GE. Additionally in 2018 Iraqi officials said the Trump administration had been heavily pressuring the country to pick GE over Siemens which eventually happened later that year.

=== Iraq Development Fund ===
In August 2023, prime minister Mohammed Shia al-Sudani established the Iraq Development Fund for the purpose of attracting foreign capital for important development projects in the country. As of 2025, the fund has garnered more than 7 billion USD in foreign direct investments.

== See also ==
- History of Iraqi insurgency
- Post-invasion Iraq, 2003–2011
- 2003 Iraq war timeline
- Development Fund for Iraq
- New Iraqi Army
- Economy of Iraq
- Iraq oil law (2007)
- Iraq sanctions
- International Compact with Iraq
- Task Force for Business and Stability Operations
- Reconstruction of Afghanistan

== External articles and references ==
- Baghdad Invest - Iraq Investment Research - Investment News
- The Ground Truth Project—A series of exclusive, in-depth interviews and other resources with Iraqis, aid workers, military personnel and others who have spent significant time working to rebuild Iraq from the inside.
- Iraq Inter-Agency Information & Analysis Unit Reports, Maps and Assessments of Iraq from the UN Inter-Agency Information & Analysis Unit
- Map of Iraq- High resolution maps of Iraq.
- Defend America: U.S. Department of Defense News About the War on Terrorism
- Measuring Stability and Security: U.S. Department of Defense Measuring Stability and Security in Iraq Quarterly Reports
- Fact Sheet on Provincial Reconstruction Teams (PRTs)
- * Kenneth M. Pollack, "After Saddam: Assessing the Reconstruction of Iraq". From foreignaffairs.org - author update, January 12, 2004.
- Iraq Analysis Economic Development Page Comprehensive information source listings on reconstruction of Iraq
- Dahar Jamail, "Iraq: The Devastation", AlterNet
- Iraq reconstruction funds missing
- Video Seminar on Iraq Coalition Politics: April 20, 2005, sponsored by the Program in Arms Control, Disarmament, and International Security at the University of Illinois.
- Baghdad Renaissance Plan
- UAE Investors Keen On Taking Part In Baghdad Renaissance Project
- Man With A Plan: Hisham Ashkouri
- Renaissance Plan In The News
- ARCADD, Inc.
- Symbion Power
