= Education in Iraq =

Ministry of Education (Iraq)
- Minister: Abdulkareem ali abtan aljbori

General details
- Primary languages: Arabic, Kurdish, Turkmen, Neo-Aramaic

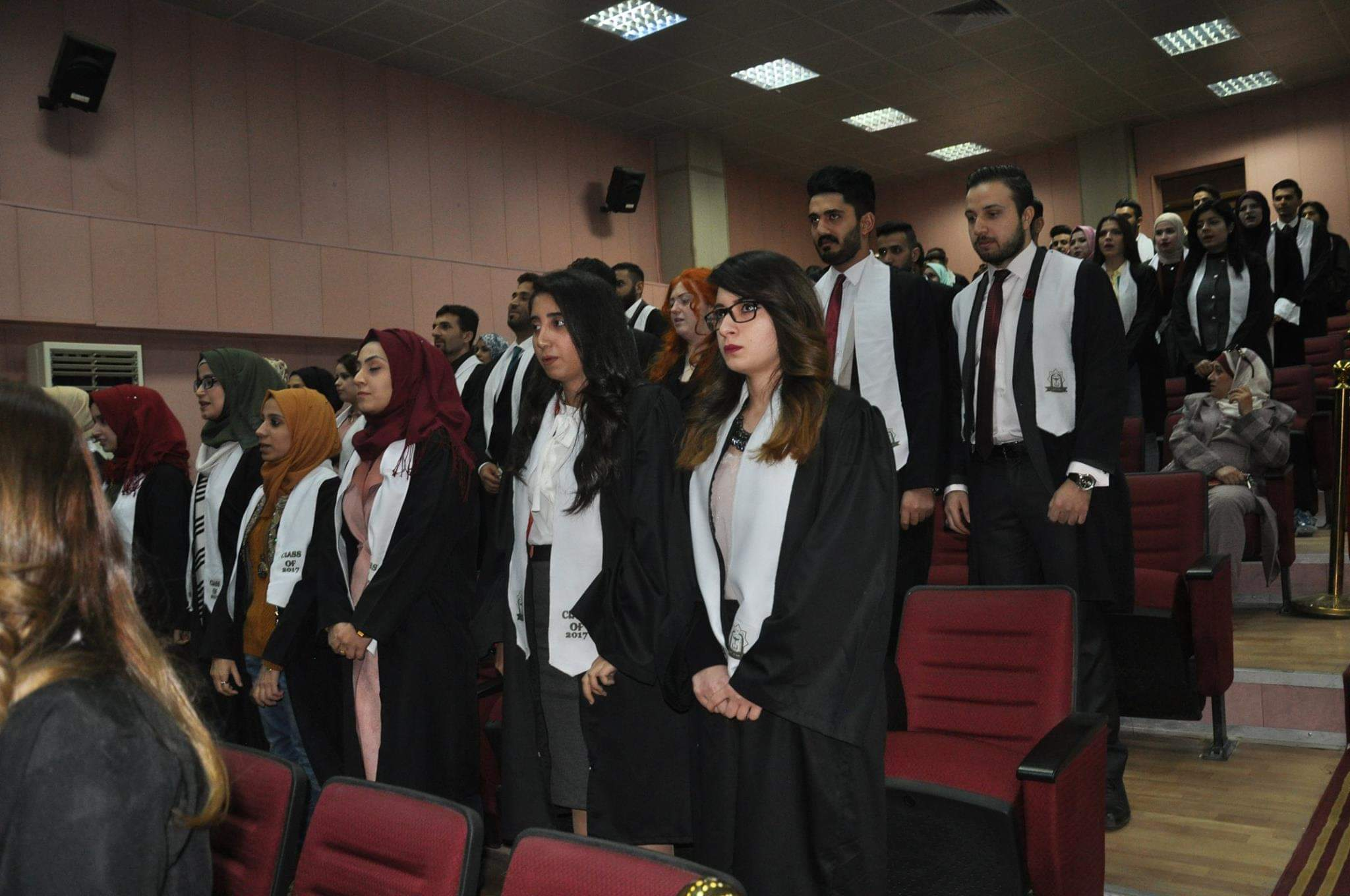
Students at Al-Kindy College of Medicine

Education in Iraq is administered by the Ministry of Education.

UNESCO reports that Iraq previously had one of the best educational performances in the Middle Eastern/West Asian region. In primary school, gross enrollment rate used to be 100%, and literacy levels were high. The illiteracy rate was 20% in 1987. However, education has suffered since the 1980s and especially the 1990s following the Gulf war, International sanctions against Iraq, the American occupation, and general instability in the country.

As of 2018, 92% of children were enrolled in primary school. However, only just over half of low-income children complete primary school, and less than a quarter complete secondary school. According to the Iraqi Ministry of Planning, the literacy rate was 88% in 2024. Each year, the Iraqi Ministry of Higher Education records roughly 50,000 master's and doctoral degrees, the majority of which are awarded to students enrolled in private universities. Iran and Lebanon are often cited as among the countries where obtaining an academic degree is comparatively more accessible.

Before Iraq faced economic sanctions from the UN, it already had an advanced and successful education system. However, it has now been "de-developing" in its educational success. In general, the education of Iraq has been improving since the MDGs were implemented. For example, enrollment numbers nearly doubled from 2000 to 2012. It went from 3.6 to 6 million. The latest statistic from 2015 to 2016 showed that almost 9.2 million children were in school. Enrollment rates continue to be on a steady increase at about 4.1% each year. The sheer increase in numbers shows that there are clearly improvements of children in Iraq having access to education. However, the dramatic increase of the number of students in primary education has had some negative and straining effects for the education system. The budget for education makes up about only 5.7% of government spending and continues to stay at or below this percentage. Investments for schools has also been on the decline. As a result, the country now ranks at the bottom of Middle East countries in terms of education. The little funding for education makes it more difficult to improve the quality and resources for education. At the same time, UNICEF investigated portions of spending for education and found that some of the money has gone to waste. They found that dropout rates are increasing as well as repetition rates for children. In both Iraq Centre and KRI, the rates for dropouts are about 1.5% to 2.5%. While the rate for dropouts for boys was around 16.5%, girls were at 20.1% where it could be due to economic or family reasons. For repetition rates, percentages have almost reached 17% among all students. As a result, almost 20% of the funding for education was lost to dropouts and repetition for the year 2014–2015.

Other statistics show that regional differences can attribute to lower or higher enrollment rates for children in primary education. For example, UNICEF found that areas with conflict like Saladin had "more than 90% of school-age children" not in the education system. In addition, some schools were converted into refugee shelters or military bases in 2014 as conflict began to increase. The resources for education become more strained and make it harder for children to go to school and finish receiving their education. However, in 2017, there were efforts being made to open up 47 schools that had previously been closed. There has been more success in Mosul where over 380,000 are going to school again. Depending on where children live, they may or may not have the same access to education as other children. There are also the differing enrollment rates between boys and girls. UNICEF found that in 2013–2014, enrollment numbers for boys was at about five million while girls were at about 4.2 million. While the out-of-school rate for girls is at about 11%, boys are at less than half of that. However, the rate of enrollments for girls has been increasing at a higher rate than for boys. In 2015–2016, the enrollment numbers for girls increased by 400,000 from the previous year where a large number of them were located in Iraq Centre. Not only that, UNICEF found that the increase of girls going to school was across all levels of education. Therefore, the unequal enrollment numbers between boys and girls could potentially change so that universal education can be achieved by all at equal rates.

== Overview ==
Before Iraq faced economic sanctions from the UN, it already had an advanced and successful education system. However, it has now been "de-developing" in its educational success.

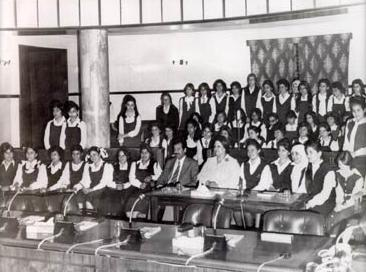
Saddam Hussein promoting women's literacy and education in the 1970s

In general, the education of Iraq has been improving since the MDGs were implemented. For example, enrollment numbers nearly doubled from 2000 to 2012. It went from 3.6 million to six million. The latest statistic from 2015 to 2016 showed that almost 9.2 million children were in school. Enrollment rates continue to be on a steady increase at about 4.1% each year. The sheer increase in numbers shows that there are clearly improvements of children in Iraq having access to education. However, the dramatic increase of the number of students in primary education has had some negative and straining effects for the education system. The budget for education makes up about only 5.7% of government spending and continues to stay at or below this percentage. Investments for schools has also been on the decline. As a result, the country now ranks at the bottom of Middle East countries in terms of education. The little funding for education makes it more difficult to improve the quality and resources for education. At the same time, UNICEF investigated portions of spending for education and found that some of the money has gone to waste. They found that dropout rates are increasing as well as repetition rates for children. In both Iraq Centre and KRI, the rates for dropouts are about 1.5% to 2.5%. While the rate for dropouts for boys was around 16.5%, girls were at 20.1% where it could be due to economic or family reasons. For repetition rates, percentages have almost reached 17% among all students. As a result, almost 20% of the funding for education was lost to dropouts and repetition for the year 2014–2015.

Other statistics show that regional differences can attribute to lower or higher enrollment rates for children in primary education. For example, UNICEF found that areas with conflict like Saladin had "more than 90% of school-age children" not in the education system. In addition, some schools were converted into refugee shelters or military bases in 2014 as conflict began to increase. The resources for education become more strained and make it harder for children to go to school and finish receiving their education. However, in 2017, there were efforts being made to open up 47 schools that had previously been closed. There has been more success in Mosul where over 380,000 are going to school again. Depending on where children live, they may or may not have the same access to education as other children. There are also the differing enrollment rates between boys and girls. UNICEF found that in 2013–2014, enrollment numbers for boys was at about five million while girls were at about 4.2 million. While the out-of-school rate for girls is at about 11%, boys are at less than half of that. However, the rate of enrollments for girls has been increasing at a higher rate than for boys. In 2015–2016, the enrollment numbers for girls increased by 400,000 from the previous year where a large number of them were located in Iraq Centre. Not only that, UNICEF found that the increase of girls going to school was across all levels of education. Therefore, the unequal enrollment numbers between boys and girls could potentially change so that universal education can be achieved by all at equal rates.

Although the numbers suggest a dramatic increase of enrollment rates for primary education in total, a large number of children still remain out of the education system. Many of these children fall under the category of internally displaced children due to the conflict in Syria and the takeover by ISIL. This causes a disruption for children who are attempting to go to school and holds them back from completing their education, no matter what level they are at. Internally displaced children are specifically recorded to track children who have been forced to move within their country due to these types of conflicts. About 355,000 of internally displaced children are not in the education system. 330,000 of those children live in Iraq Centre. The rates among internally displaced children continue to remain higher in Iraq Centre than other areas such as the KRI.

With the overall increase of enrollment rates, there continues to be a large strain on the resources for education. UNICEF notes that without an increase on expenditures for education, the quality of education will continue to decrease. Early in the 2000s, the UNESCO International Bureau of Education found that the education system in Iraq had issues with standard-built school buildings, having enough teachers, implementing a standardised curricula, textbooks and technologies that are needed to help reach its educational goals. Teachers are important resources that are starting to become more and more strained with the rising number of students. Iraq Centre has a faster enrollment growth rate than teacher growth. Teachers begin to have to take in more and more students which can produce a bigger strain on the teacher and quality of education the children receive. Another large resource for education is libraries that can increase literacy and create a reading culture. However, this can only be improved through a restructuring of the education system.

== Current structure, status, and scale of education in Iraq ==
It is generally agreed upon that before 1980, this Educational system in Iraq was one of the best in the region in addressing both access and equality. However, the situation began to deteriorate rapidly due to several wars and economic sanctions. According to UNESCO’s 2003 Situation Analysis of education in Iraq, the educational system in the Centre/South worsened despite the provision of basics through the Oil for Food Programme. Kurdistan (Kurdistan) did not suffer as much due to rehabilitation and reconstruction programs organized through several UN agencies.

Since then, major problems have emerged that are hindering the system which includes a lack of resources, the politicization of the educational system, uneven emigration and internal displacement of teachers and students, security threats, and corruption. Illiteracy is widespread in comparison with before, standing at 39% of the rural population. Almost 22% of the adult population in Iraq has never attended school, 46% attended only primary school and a mere 9% have secondary school as the highest level completed. As far as gender equity, 47% of women in Iraq are either fully or partly illiterate, as women’s education suffers from differences across regions, and especially between the North and South.

Since the 2003 invasion and the fall of the former Saddam Hussein regime, Iraqis with the help of international agencies and foreign governments, have been attempting to create frameworks that would begin to address the issues at hand.

According to the 2005 National Development Strategy of Iraq the new vision for Iraq intends to "transform Iraq into a peaceful, unified federal democracy and a prosperous, market-oriented regional economic powerhouse that is fully integrated into the global economy."

This stems from the fact that the country's economy was mismanaged for 40 years, and a country that once held a bright private sector and an educated population has come to have one of the lowest human development indicators in the region.

The National Development Strategy (NDS) contains four major areas of concentration:

- Strengthening the foundations of economic growth
- Revitalizing the private sector
- Improving quality of life
- Strengthening good governance and security

The major pillar above that includes the category of education is that of "improving quality of life", as "healthy citizens tend to be productive citizens that will be able to take advantage of the opportunities provided in a market-oriented economy." The exact strategy towards education includes "investing in human capital with a focus on adult literacy, vocational training, and actions to reduce drop-out rates at the primary level".

=== Challenges & problems per the current conditions of education in Iraq ===
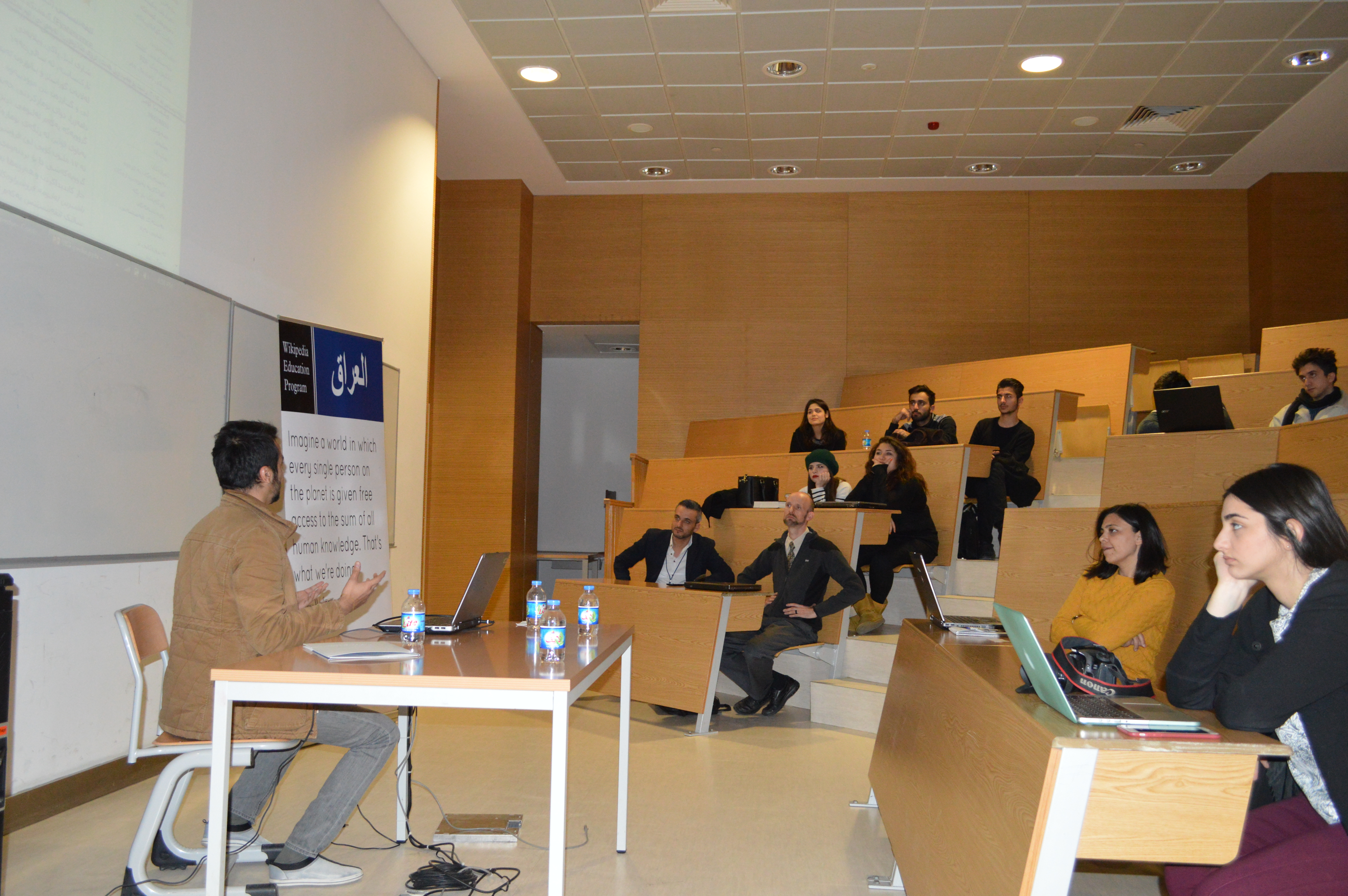
University students in Iraq, 2016

There is currently an insufficient supply of schools, and most schools suffer from poor conditions, some of which include:

- Gap of 3590 schools in 2003 resulted in double or triple shifts in school buildings
- About 70% of schools lack clean water and latrines
- Almost 1000 schools are built from mud, straw, or tents
- Poor quality of inputs includes: science labs, libraries, equipment, an outdated curriculum, lack of teacher training and food sources, and staff absenteeism
- Centralized administration
- Insufficient jobs for university graduates, and falling academic standards in many universities
- Lack of resources and support for Special Educational Needs (SEN) including autism.

Since 2003 and the fall of the dictatorial regime, the war against Saddam Hussein and sectarian conflict has further destabilized the education system in Iraq.

- 2751 schools were damaged severely and require rehabilitation, and 2400 schools experienced looting
- Schools in dangerous areas were forced to close for extended periods
- Education personals were targeted, kidnapped, attacked, and or killed
- Teacher absenteeism and that of girls reached a high level, due to the security threat
- Bombings in Baghdad claimed the lives of 16 students

Since the bombing at Samar’a in 2006, the displacement of both teachers and students has been another factor in the destabilization of the system.

- ~320,000 students are displaced (200,000 internally)
- ~65% of the displaced are males while girls tend to drop out
- ~20,000 teachers are displaced
- Internal migration patterns vary, which places a burden on the system as it cannot deal with changing demands
- External displacement is located mostly in Jordan (where the students are absorbed into the system, with fees paid by the MOE in Iraq), Syria (where the students continue forward with the Iraqi education system and testing), and Egypt

=== Current resources devoted to education in Iraq ===
Since May 2003, international agencies have been involved in supporting education in Iraq, but fragmented data has not allowed these numbers to be integrated into the governmental budget. The United Nations (~US$80 million) and World Bank have two trust funds that go to help Iraq specifically, while USAID has contracted through the US Supplemental Budget for Iraq. Although these programs are a great beginning, they do not reach the level as assessed by the October 2003 UN/WB Needs Assessment Study ($4.8 billion).

Current Projects financed by the Iraq Trust Fund, include but are not limited to:

- Emergency Textbook Provision Project (US$40 million): Since May 2004, the project is intended to finance and distribute 69 million textbooks for 6 million students spread across all of the governorates for the 2004/05 year.
- Emergency School Construction Rehabilitation Project (US$60 million): Since October 2004, the project is meant to construct 55 school buildings and rehabilitate 133 schools. The rehabilitation of 133 schools is complete, at an average cost of US$181 per student, and benefits 45,000 pupils while creating 3,000 construction jobs.
- Emergency School Construction Rehabilitation Project- Supplemental Grant for Marshland Schools (US$6 million): Since October 2006, the grant provides additional funding for the Emergency School Construction and Rehabilitation Project to construct around 33 new schools in the Marshland areas of Iraq. This would go to benefit between 6,000 and 8,000 children in that region and create near-term employment opportunities within construction. Local stakeholders are involved (i.e. NGOs).
- Third Emergency Education Project (US$100 million): The funds are from the International Development Agency (IDA), in collaboration with the World Bank. This project is in progress as of July 2008 and aims to develop a national school construction and maintenance program as well as offer capacity-building activities.
- A distance learning via satellite television project is underway with UN agencies to produce programs for displaced persons (US$5 million, but not part of the Iraq Trust Fund).

=== Current actions ===
Despite endless daily challenges, the education system in Iraq continues to function. Actions thus far include but are not limited to:

- 3600 schools rehabilitated
- 120,000 teachers recruited
- Focus on girls' education
- Curriculum reform
- Provision of learning resources
- Distance learning programs for out-of-school children (i.e. in Syria)
- Organizational chart reform
- Increasing collaboration with external partners

== Education after the 2003 U.S. invasion ==
Following the 2003 invasion of Iraq, the Coalition Provisional Authority, with substantial international assistance, undertook a complete reform of Iraq's education system. Among immediate goals were the removal of previously pervasive Baathist ideology from curricula and substantial increases in teacher salaries and training programs, which the Ba'athist regime was unable to provide in the 1990s. The new Ministry of Education appointed a national curriculum commission to revise curricula in all subject areas. Because of underfunding by the Hussein regime, in 2003 an estimated 80 per cent of Iraq's 15,000 school buildings needed rehabilitation and lacked basic sanitary facilities, and most schools lacked libraries and laboratories. John Agresto, the Coalition Provisional Authority official tasked with reconstructing the Iraqi university system, asked for $1 billion to rebuild the universities but only received $8 million.

In the 1990s, school attendance decreased drastically as education funding was cut and economic conditions forced children into the workforce. After the regime change, the system included about 6 million students in kindergarten through twelfth grade and 300,000 teachers and administrators. Education is mandatory only through the sixth grade, after which a national examination determines the possibility of continuing into the upper grades. Although a vocational track is available to those who do not pass the exam, few students elect that option because of its poor quality. Boys and girls generally attend separate schools beginning with seventh grade. In 2005 obstacles to further reform were poor security conditions in many areas, a centralized system that lacked accountability for teachers and administrators, and the isolation in which the system functioned for the previous 30 years. Few private schools exist. (One notable example: The Classical School of the Medes in Northern Iraq.) Before the occupation of 2003, some 240,000 persons were enrolled in institutions of higher education. The CIA World Factbook estimates that in 2000 the adult literacy rate was 84 per cent for males and 64 per cent for females, with UN figures suggesting a small fall in literacy of Iraqis aged 15–24 between 2000 and 2008, from 84.8% to 82.4%.

Education under the Kurdistan Regional Government (KRG) in Iraqi Kurdistan in northern Iraq faces many problems. There is a large number of people who have "fake and bogus awards like MAs, PhDs and professorial titles". Loyal political party members with fake university titles hold "high official ranks from ministries to university chancellors, deans of colleges, general managers, administrators, supervisors and school headmasters". Critics state that education in Iraqi Kurdistan is "overshadowed by political rivalry, media propaganda, fake patriotism, nationalist sentiments and party affiliation".

== Iraqi Education Under Saddam ==
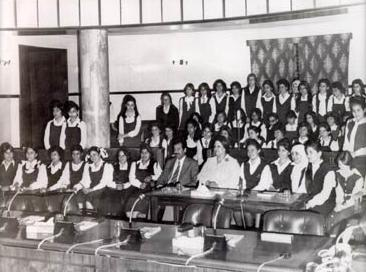
Saddam Hussein Promoting women's literacy and education in the 1970s

Iraq established its education system in 1921 (during the British Mandate period) and offered both public and private educational paths. In the early 1970s, education became public and free at all levels, and mandatory at the primary level. Two ministries came to manage the education system in Iraq: the Ministry of Education (MOE) and the Ministry of Higher Education and Scientific Research (MOHSR). The MOHSR is in charge of tertiary education and research centres while the MOE is predominantly in charge of primary and secondary schooling and its related fields of influence.

On 1 June 1972, Saddam Hussein oversaw the nationalization of international oil interests, and the Iraq National Oil Company which, at the time, dominated the country's oil sector. A year later, world oil prices rose dramatically as a result of the 1973 oil crisis, which stemmed from the 1973 Oil Boycott and embargo against the U.S. and the West due to its support of Israel, and as a result, skyrocketing revenues enabled Saddam to expand his agenda, which included expansion of education and eradication of illiteracy. Within just a few years, Iraq was providing social services that were unprecedented among Middle Eastern countries. Saddam established and controlled the "National Campaign for the Eradication of Illiteracy" and the campaign for "Compulsory Free Education in Iraq," and largely under his auspices, the government established universal free schooling up to the highest education levels; hundreds of thousands learned to read in the years following the initiation of the program. The government also supported families of soldiers, granted free hospitalization to everyone, and gave subsidies to farmers. Iraq created one of the most modernized public-health systems in the Middle East, earning Saddam an award from the United Nations Educational, Scientific and Cultural Organization (UNESCO).

== Education under the Baathist regime before the 1990s ==
General trends of education during the Baathist era in Iraq (from the 1958 revolution to the deposition of Sadaam Hussein in 2003) included expanded access, decreased illiteracy, increased gender parity, and the rise of the reputation of Iraq as a centre of education in the Arab region. Primary education was made free and compulsory after the 1958 revolution, and secondary and higher education would be dramatically expanded as well after the nationalization of oil in the 1970s. The Baath party is also known to have "popularized women's education" during their rule, and women's literacy rates became the highest among Muslim- majority countries. In terms of curriculum, emphasis was placed on cohering an Iraq nationalist identity around loyalty to the state and "a narrow ideal of nationalism that bolstered Sunni minority rule over a Shi'ite majority and large Kurdish population."

The impact of government policies on the class structure and stratification patterns can be imputed from available statistics on education and training as well as employment and wage structures. Owing to the historic emphasis on the expansion of educational facilities, the leaders of the Baath Party and indeed much of Iraq's urban middle class were able to move from rural or urban lower-class origins to middle and even top positions in the state apparatus, the public sector, and the society at large.

This social history is confirmed in the efforts of the government to generalize opportunities for basic education throughout the country. Between 1976 and 1986, the number of primary-school students increased by 30 per cent; female students increased by 45 per cent, from 35 to 44 per cent of the total. The number of primary-school teachers increased by 40 per cent over this period. At the secondary level, the number of students increased by 46 per cent, and the number of female students increased by 55 per cent, from 29 to 36 per cent of the total. Baghdad, which had about 29 per cent of the population, had 26 per cent of the primary students, 27 per cent of the female primary students, and 32 per cent of the secondary students.

Education was provided by the government through a centrally organized school system. In the early 1980s, the system included a six-year primary (or elementary) level known as the first level. The second level, also six years, consisted of an intermediate-secondary and an intermediate-preparatory, each of three years. Graduates of these schools could enroll in a vocational school, one of the teacher training schools or institutes, or one of the various colleges, universities, or technical institutes.

The number of students enrolled in primary and secondary schools was highest in the central region of the country and lowest in the north, although the enrollment of the northern schools was only slightly lower than that of the south. Before the war, the government had made considerable gains in lessening the extreme concentration of primary and secondary educational facilities in the main cities, notably Baghdad. Vocational education, which had been notoriously inadequate in Iraq, received considerable official attention in the 1980s. The number of students in technical fields had increased threefold since 1977, to over 120,090 in 1986.

The Baath regime also seemed to have made progress since the late 1960s in reducing regional disparities, although they were far from eliminated and no doubt were more severe than official statistics would suggest. Baghdad, for example, was the home of most educational facilities above the secondary level, since it was the site not only of Baghdad University, which in the academic year 1983–84 (the most recent year for which statistics were available in early 1988) had 34,555 students, but also of the Foundation of Technical Institutes, with 34,277 students, Mustansiriya University, with 11,686 students, and the University of Technology, with 7,384 students. The universities in Basra, Mosul, and Erbil, taken together, enrolled 26 per cent of all students in higher education in the academic year 1983–84.

The number of students seeking to pursue higher education in the 1980s increased dramatically. Accordingly, in the mid-1980s, the government made plans to expand Salahaddin University in Erbil in the north and to establish Ar-Rashid University outside Baghdad. The latter was not yet in existence in early 1988 but both were designed ultimately to accommodate 50,000 students. In addition, at the end of December 1987, the government announced plans to create four more universities: one in Tikrit in the central area, one each at Al Kufah and Al Qadisiyah in the south, and one at Al Anbar in the west. Details of these universities were not known.

With the outbreak of the war, the government faced a dilemma regarding education. Despite the shortage of wartime manpower, the regime was unwilling to tap the pool of available university students, arguing that these young people were Iraq's hope for the future. As of early 1988, therefore, the government routinely exempted students from military service until graduation, a policy it adhered to rigorously.

== See also ==
- List of schools in Iraq
- Violence against academics in post-invasion Iraq
