= Economic reform of Iraq =

Economic reform in Iraq describes decisions by the Coalition Provisional Authority to dramatically change the economy of Iraq in the aftermath of the 2003 U.S.-led invasion.

Prior to US occupation, Iraq had a centrally planned economy. Among other things, it prohibited foreign ownership of Iraqi businesses, ran most large industries as state-owned enterprises, and imposed large tariffs to keep out foreign goods. After the 2003 Invasion of Iraq, the Coalition Provisional Authority quickly began issuing many binding orders privatizing Iraq's economy and opening it up to foreign investment.

Economic reform was implemented alongside reform of government institutions, the Iraqi legal system, and significant international investment to repair or replace damaged infrastructure of Iraq.

While reform efforts have produced some successes, problems have arisen with the implementation of internationally funded Iraq reconstruction efforts. These include inadequate security, pervasive corruption, insufficient funding and poor coordination among international agencies and local communities.

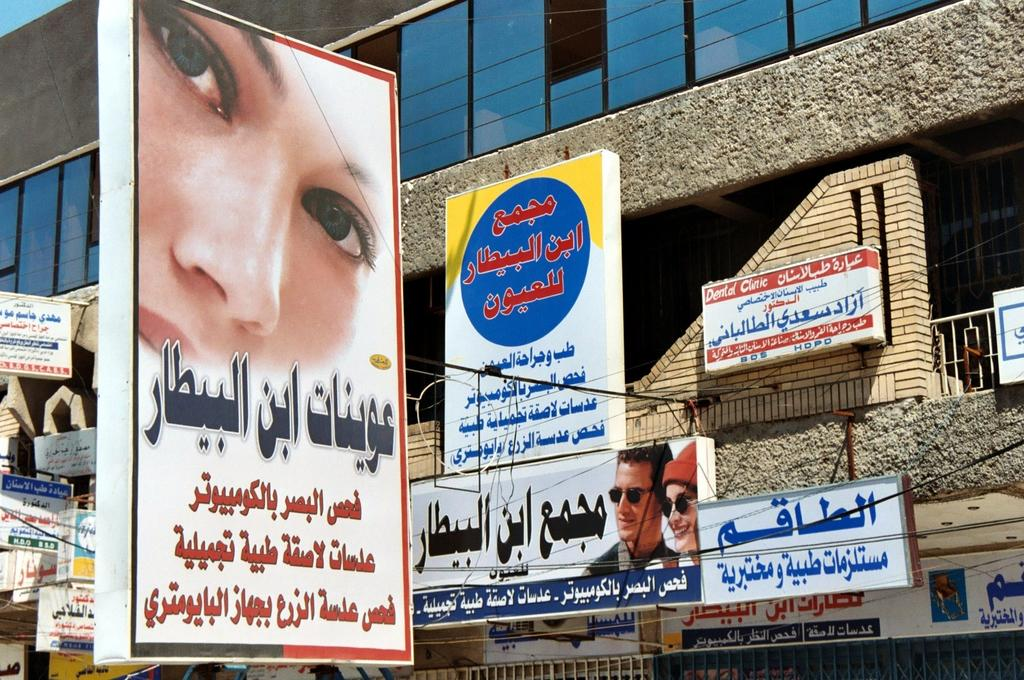
Business storefront signs in downtown Baghdad, Iraq in April 2005.

== Planning ==
Paul Bremer, chief executive the Coalition Provisional Authority of Iraq, planned to restructure Iraq's state owned economy with free market thinking. Bremer dropped the corporate tax rate from around 45% to a flat tax rate of 15% and allowed foreign corporations to repatriate all profits earned in Iraq. Opposition from senior Iraqi officials, together with the poor security situation, meant that Bremer's privatization plan was not implemented during his tenure, though his orders remain in place. In addition to approximately 200 other state owned businesses, privatization of the oil industry was scheduled to begin sometime in late 2005, though it is opposed by the Federation of Oil Unions in Iraq.

== Privatization of Iraqi oil ==
Order 39 laid out the framework for full privatization in Iraq, except for "primary extraction and initial processing" of oil, and permitted 100% foreign ownership of Iraqi assets. The Iraq oil law is a proposed piece of legislation submitted to the Iraqi Council of Representatives in May 2007.

The Iraqi government has yet to reach an agreement on the law. In June 2008, the Iraqi Oil Ministry announced plans to go ahead with small one or two year no-bid contracts to ExxonMobil, Shell, Total and BP — once partners in the Iraq Petroleum Company — along with Chevron and smaller firms to service Iraq's largest fields. These plans were canceled in September because negotiations had stalled for so long that the work could not be completed within the time frame, according to Iraqi oil minister Hussain al-Shahristani. Several United States senators had also criticized the deal, arguing it was hindering efforts to pass the hydrocarbon law.

Bremer's transitional government featured figures close to the George W. Bush administration, such as grain-trading industry lobbyist Dan Amstutz, who was put in charge of agricultural policy in Iraq.

== Foreign Investment and trade ==
CPA Order 39, entitled "Foreign Investment", provided that "A foreign investor shall be entitled to make foreign investments in Iraq on terms no less favorable than those applicable to an Iraqi investor," and that "[t]he amount of foreign participation in newly formed or existing business entities in Iraq shall not be limited...." Additionally, the foreign investor "shall be authorized to... transfer abroad without delay all funds associated with its foreign investment, including shares or profits and dividends...."

By this order, critics assert that the CPA drastically altered Iraq's economy, allowing virtually unlimited and unrestricted foreign investment and placing no limitations on the expatriation of profit. However, these policies accord with current international standards on foreign direct investment which most of the developed world adheres to. The order concluded, "Where an international agreement to which Iraq is a party provides for more favorable terms with respect to foreign investors undertaking investment activities in Iraq, the more favorable terms under the international agreement shall apply."

According to critics such as Naomi Klein, this order was designed to create as favorable an environment for foreign investors as possible, thereby allowing American and multinational corporations to dominate Iraq's economy. Significant criticism has suggested these policies are fundamentally anti-democratic, that such rules can only be legitimate if passed by an elected Iraqi government free of foreign occupation. Others argue that the rules merely bring Iraq's economic law into conformity with modern norms of international trade, and that the previous government and its laws were not democratically legitimate since Saddam Hussein's government was not elected.

CPA Order 17 granted all foreign contractors operating in Iraq immunity from "Iraqi legal process," effectively granting immunity from any kind of suit, civil or criminal, for actions the contractors engaged in within Iraq.

CPA Order 12, amended by Order 54, suspended all tariffs, thus removing the advantage that domestic Iraqi producers had over foreign producers. However, a 5% "reconstruction levy" on all imported goods was later reimposed to help finance Iraqi-initiated reconstruction projects.

== Taxation ==
CPA Order 49 provided a tax cut for corporations operating within Iraq. It reduced the rate from a maximum of 40% to a maximum of 15% on income. Corporations working with the CPA were exempted from owing any tax.

== Foreign debt ==
One of the key economic challenges was Iraq's immense foreign debt, estimated at $130 billion. Although some of this debt was derived from normal export contracts that Iraq had failed to pay for, almost all of it was a result of military and financial support during Iraq's war with Iran.

The Jubilee Iraq campaign argued that much of these debts were odious (illegitimate). However, as the concept of odious debt is not accepted, trying to deal with the debt on those terms would have embroiled Iraq in legal disputes for years. Iraq decided to deal with its debt more pragmatically and approached the Paris Club of official creditors. Iraq restructured its debt with official and commercial creditors between 2006 and 2008.

== Effects ==
The utilisation of what has been called by Joseph Stiglitz arguably the most radical market shock therapy tried anywhere helped to inflame sectarian divisions and greatly impeded Iraq's process of reconstruction and recovery. The CPA's policies led to the firing of up to 10% of the Iraqi labour force due to De-Ba'athification. Unemployment subsequently went up from 16.8% to 28.1% by the end of 2003. Independent estimates however said that unemployment by the end of 2005 could have been as high as 40%. The rapid rise in unemployment caused by the CPA's economic reforms helped push Iraqis toward supporting insurgency as alternative forms of employment. The CPA's reforms left future governments in Iraq beholden to financial pressures, which left Iraq more amenable to exploitative influence from the International Monetary Fund.

Since the peak of 1980, the nominal GDP of Iraq has steadily shrunk to merely $12.3 billion in 2000 primarily due to sanctions and the consequences of the bombing of Iraq during the Gulf War. However removal of sanctions, after the overthrow of Saddam, had immediate effect. The nominal GDP had reached $55.4 billion by 2007 due to increase in oil output as well as international prices. In 2006, the real GDP growth was estimated at almost 17 percent.

In a December 2006 Newsweek International article, a study by Global Insight in London was reported to show that

Civil war or not, Iraq has an economy, and—mother of all surprises—it's doing remarkably well. Real estate is booming. Construction, retail and wholesale trade sectors are healthy, too, according to [the report].The U.S. Chamber of Commerce reports 34,000 registered companies in Iraq, up from 8,000 three years ago. Sales of secondhand cars, televisions and mobile phones have all risen sharply. Estimates vary, but one from Global Insight puts GDP growth at 17 percent last year and projects 13 percent for 2006. The World Bank has it lower: at 4 percent this year. But, given all the attention paid to deteriorating security, the startling fact is that Iraq is growing at all.

However, other metrics demonstrated that Iraq's economy continued to struggle. While rising oil prices in 2005 and 2006 helped cause an uptick in Iraq's GDP, this did not translate to any meaningful increase in living standards as the oil sector accounted for only 1% of the labour force. Furthermore, as a result of the CPA's liberalisation the energy sector did not recover. Electricity production in 2006 was 15% lower than pre-invasion levels, and the failure to reconstruct Iraqi energy led to a rise in malnutrition, crude mortality rates, and a diminished access to clean water. In addition, the imposition of free trade resulted in the devastation of Iraq's domestic manufacturing industries. The CPA suspended all tariffs, import taxes, custom duties, and licensing fees resulting in a deluge of one-way trade where more competitive commodities flooded the market which destroyed what remained of Iraq's manufacturing sector. The resulting rise in impoverished capitalists and business owners and members of the labour force benefitted the Iraqi insurgency as they gained access to new recruits and sources of funding.

The effects of liberalisation of security also had harmful effects to Iraq. Order 27 created a "mercenary market" in Iraq. Jobs that would otherwise have been carried out by the military or the police were instead done by private contractors of either Iraqi or non-Iraqi origin who had the same privileges as military and police officers without any amount of accountability. As a result, Iraq ended up losing its "monopoly on violence" to private contractors with approximately 100,000 mercenaries being employed in Iraq following the issuing of Order 27, many of whom engaged in acts of torture, abuse, and killings.

Between 100,000 barrels per day (16,000 m^{3}/d) and 300,000 barrels per day (48,000 m^{3}/d) of Iraq's declared oil production over the past four years could have been siphoned off through corruption or smuggling, according to a US Study from May 12, 2007.

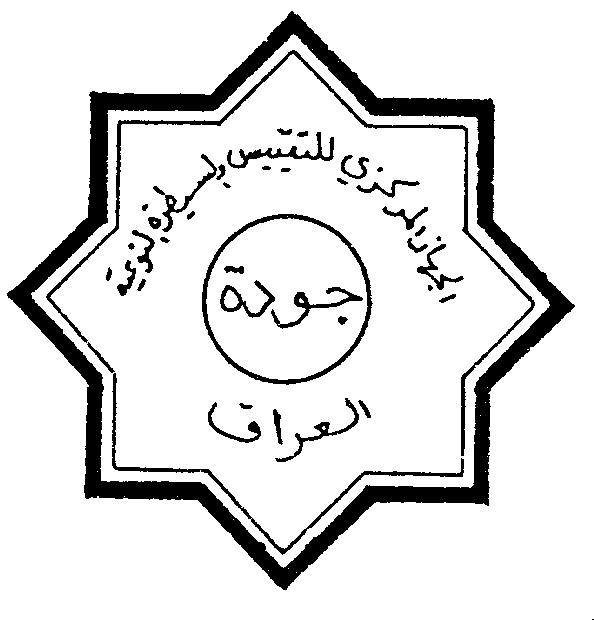
National quality mark of Iraq

Because of the economic potential of Iraq, a niche market for Iraqi Dinar currency has emerged. Speculators are making investments in the Iraqi Dinar in hopes of receiving a return once Iraq stabilizes as a country. Jim Cramer's October 20, 2009 endorsement of the Iraqi Dinar on CNBC has further piqued interest in the investment.

== Moral and International Law debate ==
Critics of the CPA argue that these policies were not only rather blatant attempts to shape Iraq's economy in the interests of American (and other) investors and against the interests of Iraqis themselves, but also that they were illegal under international law (specifically the Hague Resolutions and the Geneva Conventions) because an occupying power is prohibited from rewriting the laws of the occupied country.

The CPA argued that imposing Order 39 was permitted under the United Nations Security Council Resolution 1483, because it required the CPA to "promote the welfare of the Iraqi people through the effective administration of the territory," and to create "conditions in which the Iraqi people can freely determine their own political future." Proponents of this position state Resolution 1483 necessarily requires radical economic restructuring, so it allowed an exception to international law regarding occupation. However, others point out that Resolution 1483 "calls upon all concerned to comply with international law including in particular the Geneva Conventions of 1949", which would require an occupying force to respect the laws in force in the country unless absolutely prevented.

== See also ==
- Iraq withdrawal benchmarks
- The UN Security Council and the Iraq war
- Investment in post-invasion Iraq
