= Al Mutamayizeen Secondary =

Special secondary school in Baghdad, Iraq

Al-Khadraa D.H.S
- Arabic: ثانوية متميزين الخضراء
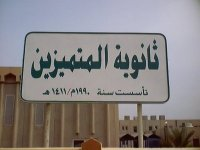
- Welcome sign

Location
- Al-Khadhraa Quarter, Baghdad; Baghdad; Iraq

Information
- Type: Public School
- Established: 1990
- Age: 34+

Mutamayizeen Al-Khadraa (Khadraa Distinguished High School for Boys, K.D.H.S; Arabic: ثانوية متميزين الخضراء للبنين) is a special secondary school located in Baghdad, Iraq.

The school was established by the Ministry of Education directly for students who met high academic requirements. Along with Baghdad College. Two high schools were established (one for boys and one for girls) in 1990 in the neighborhood of Al Khadhraa. After the fall of the former Iraqi regime in 2003 and the restructuring of the Ministry of Education, the quality of education decreased significantly. Most of the professors with doctoral degrees emigrated from Iraq. For these many reasons, K.D.S hold the education to high, different level for students, and collaboration with the best teachers in Baghdad from long time ago.

At the current moment, many schools have been implemented whether in Baghdad or in the provinces for the same purposes.

K.D.S has earned the most efficient education award from the Ministry of Education in Iraq for the year 2020. Their graduated students are always proud of the school work around ages. Around half of the Medicine students in Baghdad's public universities have graduated from Distinguished Schools (whether this one or other schools with similar educational systems)

Prior to enrollment, students must pass academic and IQ tests to be accepted in. The students study in English rather than Arabic for scientific subjects. This matter caused polemics due to the fact that, although these students study different curriculums from those of other schools, no special procedures have been implemented to invest in their academic capacities. Not forgetting to mention the inequality for Distinguished Schools, and that is one of typographical errors in the questions and the curriculum, and making them a special channel to apply to universities, but despite that, the questions come different for them, and the parents still object to this injustice to this day.
