= International Compact with Iraq =

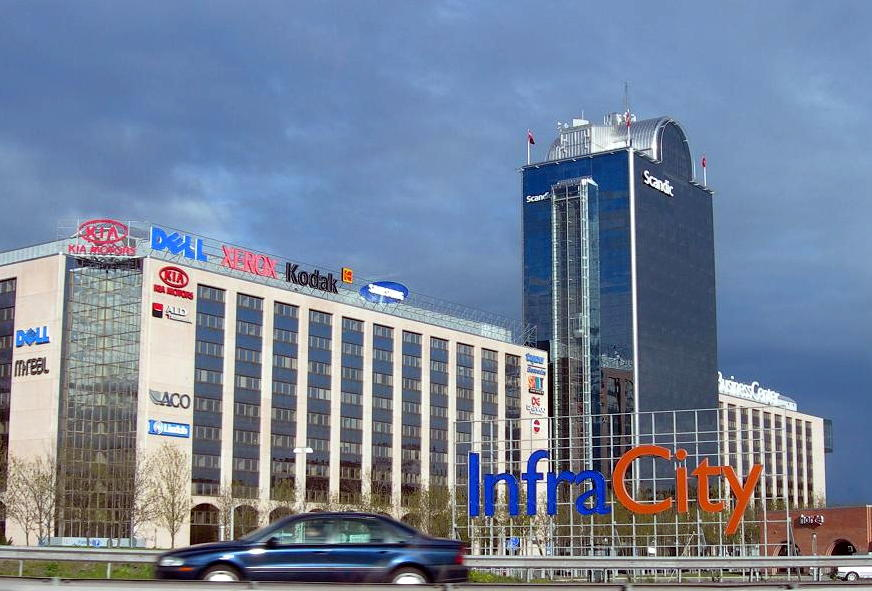
The Compact was held at Infra City in Upplands Väsby

The International Compact with Iraq is (was?) a joint initiative of the Government of Iraq and the United Nations launched in 2007 for a new partnership between Iraq and the international community.

The Compact, jointly chaired by the Government of the Republic of Iraq and the United Nations, with the support of the World Bank, established a vision that, "five years from now, Iraq shall be a united, federal and democratic country, at peace with its neighbours and itself, well on its way to sustainable economic self-sufficiency and prosperity and well integrated in its region and the world." Guided by the Millennium Development Goals, the Government planned to work to meet basic needs, protect the rights of all citizens and ensure the optimal use of the country's resources for the common good and "bring together the international community and multilateral organizations to help Iraq achieve its national vision." The Compact intended to establish benchmarks and mutual commitments for Iraq and the international community regarding normalizing the security environment, reconciling the political environment, and revitalizing the economic environment.

The Compact was announced July 27, 2006, was formally introduced at the United Nations on March 16, 2007, and was officially launched May 3, 2007.

The first annual review conference for the Compact was held in Stockholm on May 29, 2008. In August, 2008, a cooperation agreement between the United Nations and Iraq’s Government was reached defining a strategy to support Iraq’s reconstruction, development and humanitarian needs for the period 2008-2010

== See also ==
- Reconstruction of Iraq
