= Markaziyah High School =

Old Iraqi High School

Al-Markaziyya الإعدادية المركزية

Location
- Baghdad; Iraq
- Coordinates: 33.3427°N 44.3848°E

Information
- Type: Public High School
- Established: 1 January 1918
- Founder: Iraqi Ministry of Education
- Principal: Mazen Fadhil Al-Muttalibi (current principal)
- Grades: Secondary
- Gender: Co-educational
- Language: Arabic, English, French

Al-Markaziyya is the Anglicized form of Central (Arabic: المركزية) full name Al-Idadiyah al-Markaziyya (الإعدادية المركزية) is the oldest and most renowned high school in Iraq. It was established in 1918 in Baghdad and has been offering classes in science and literature in addition to Arabic, English and French.

== History ==
The idea to establish al-Markaziyya High School goes back to 16 April 1918, when the Iraqi Ministry of Education (وزارة المعارف) expressed its intention to found a secondary school for the teaching of modern science and literature for three years post elementary school. Dawood Niazi was then appointed principal of the School and al-Khatuniyya School's building (المدرسة الخاتونية) located in Abbas Effendi area on al-Jumhuriya Street(شارع الجمهورية) of Baghdad was chosen to temporarily host the School. However, the opening of the School was long overdue, and following the end of the elementary school year, a number of teachers met at the home of Mohammed Naji al-Qishtini, Principal of al-Baroodiyah School to discuss the matter. They agreed on opening one secondary school class at al-Haydariyya School building, which was then run by Abd al-Majid Zeedan. When this class was opened, 15 students who had just finished elementary school applied for admission. However, the British authorities soon closed the class, but pressure and perseverance from parents resulted in Major Bauman, Warden for Education in Iraq, agreeing to reopen the class for the academic year 1919–1920.

The class had 7 students only, and teachers were brought for them from the American University of Beirut. However, when the first school year concluded, it was decided to open an inclusive secondary school, and the building of Old Missions Department (دائرة البعثات القديمة) was allocated for the School. The School was provided with Iraqi and Arab prominent teachers such as Abd al-Majid Khoja, Muhiddin al-Nasiri, and Abd al-Aziz al-Pachachi. The School was soon moved to the building of al-Ittihad School, which was later named Al-Ma’mooniyya (المأمونية), until it was allocated a building that it continues to occupy today.

The current building of Al-Markaziyya was built in 1789 during the days of Abd al-Rahman Pasha, the Fourth Pasha of Baghdad. The Pasha served for a second term in the reign of Sultan Murad, son of Sultan Abdülmecid I, and was the seventh among the 28 Pashas of Baghdad, whose last was Khalil Pasha, during whose term, Baghdad was occupied by the British.

== Students and the School System ==
In the early years, the number of students was very limited, especially when only the remarkably smart students or the sons of merchants and elite families were admitted. Around 20% of the students were Jewish. The system applied at the School was at first military-based, then became civilian. Every student was charged a fee that amounted to one Rupee (as of 11 September 1920). The School's student uniform consisted of a dark suit, bow tie, and the Sidara.

One of the prerequisites for admission at the time was that the student had to submit a certificate of good conduct signed by the police station. The tuition fee for one school year was 2.250 dinars and was collected in three installments throughout the year. A student whose father's monthly income was less than 16.875 or whose father was a teacher was exempt from paying the tuition fee, and any student who brought a testimony from the mayor that his family was underprivileged was exempt from paying for textbooks.

The school developed a student file system that included detailed information about each student, including name, date of birth, and father's occupation, in addition to a health book, which included a record of physical examination of head, eyes, mouth and hallmarks of all students. For example, Abd al-Karim Qasim's (Founder of the Republic of Iraq) file, who was admitted to the School in 1926, mentions a scar on his upper lip, and 150 cm height) in addition to records of his performance.

The School had 31 principals, starting with General Nadhif al-Shawi and ending with Mazen Fadhil Al-Muttalibi (current principal). Ala’aldeen Al-Rayis has spent the longest period as principal of the School (1947–1958).

The first play in Iraq was performed at the School's theatre (Ms. Bell's Theater), which was then the only one in Iraq. The play was directed by Hakki Al-Shibli.

King Faisal I used to visit the School on the first day of the school year and sign on the teachers book to honor them.

In addition to maintaining academic excellence, the School was known for having wide athletic activities. It had teams for soccer, basketball, volleyball, boxing, wrestling, and equestrian, and contended different famous teams in the 1930s and 1940s, including the Royal Guards and Air Force.

The School offered classes on many branches of literature, science, business, languages, including Arabic, English and French, and many extra-curricular activity such as music and acting.

The School's library was founded with the establishment of the School and contains a variety of books and publications that cover all branches of knowledge and it used the Dewey decimal method for classification.

== Graduates of the School ==
Al-Markaziya High School played a major role in the Iraqi educational process and has offered the country a crowd of competencies that contributed to the march of scientific progress. Among the School's graduates are:

- Abd al-Karim Qasim, founder of the Republic of Iraq (1958).
- Abd al-Rahman Arif, former President
- Abd al-Salam Arif, former President
- Naji Talib, former Prime Minister
- Ali al-Wardi, renowned sociologist
