= Dwarozh Private School =

Dwarozh School
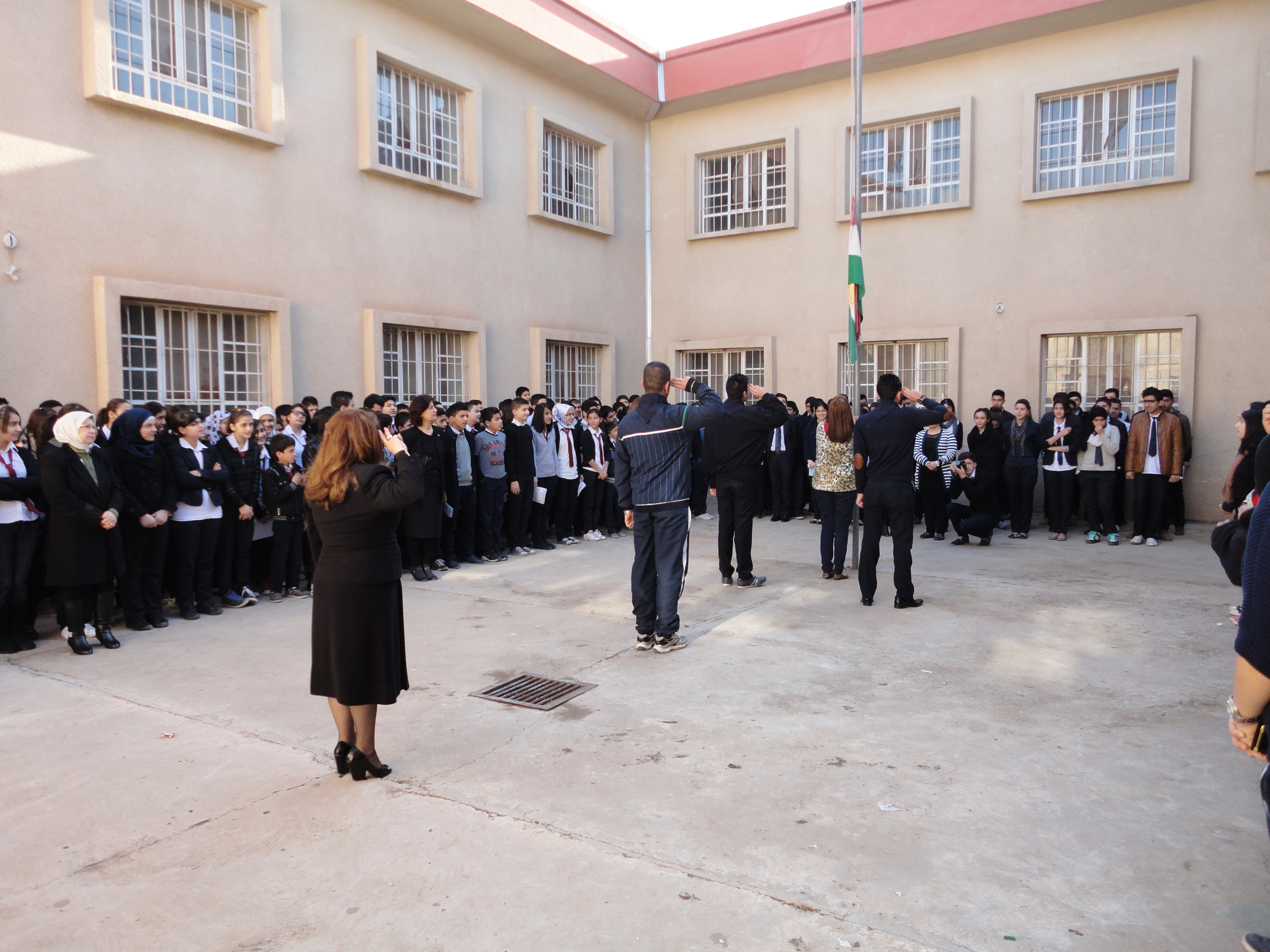
- Dwarozh School raising the Flag of Kurdistan in 2013

Location
- Sulaymaniyah Province; Iraq
- Coordinates: 35.5710°N 45.3972°E

Information
- Former name: Dwarozh Typical School (renamed to Hawcharkh in 2007), Dwarozh Private School
- Type: Public, Free of Charge
- Established: 1 January 2010
- Authority: Ministry of Education (Iraq)
- Grades: Secondary, Preparatory
- Enrollment: Local and international students (including non-Kurdish students)
- Language: English, Kurdish
- Website: Archived website

Dwarozh School is the only English language public school which is free of charge in Sulaymaniyah Province, Iraq. The school belongs to the Ministry of Education.

== Raising Kurdistan flag ==
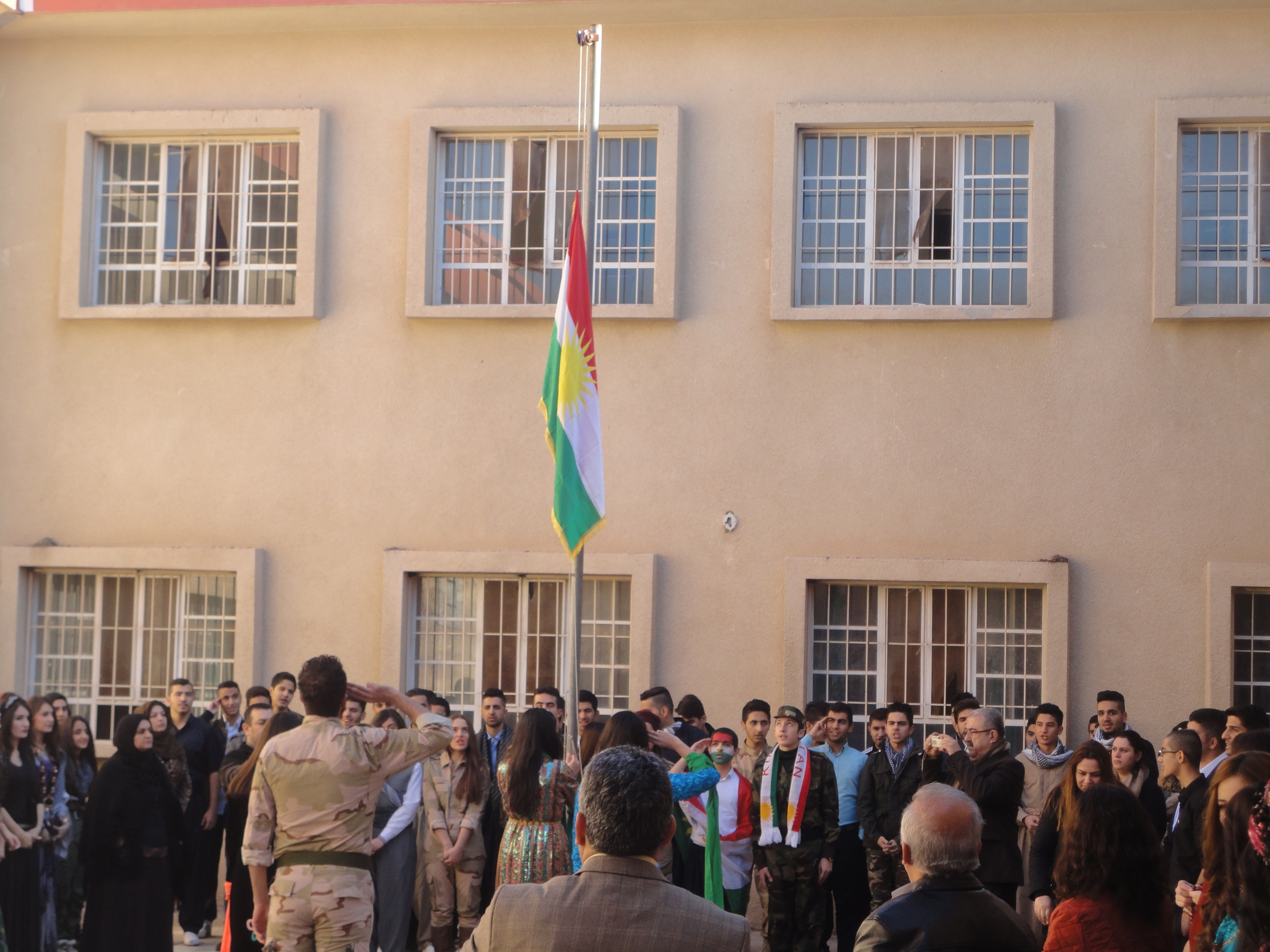
Dwarozh school when Raise the Flag of Kurdistan on the Kurdish National Flag Day 17-12-2014

Every Saturday in this school, three students raise the Flag of Kurdistan, and the principal with the physical education teacher perform the raising of the flag, while performing the Kurdish National Anthem Ey Reqîb. The picture shows the raising of the flag in 2013 and 2014.

== History ==
In 2010 many students began to attend the school, both from local and international background. In this year, the school also split into two independent schools. One of the schools is the Dwarozh Typical School, whose name was recently (2007) changed to Hawcharkh. The typical school is for those students who rank top of their classes, with an average of 85 or above when they pass primary school. The other school, Dwarozh Private School, is for those students who come from outside the country, with no regard to their average scores. Both schools are housed in the same building but attendance times are different for each school.

== Current state of the school ==
In 2013 the school was renamed "Dwarozh Private School" and has both secondary and preparatory school. It still accepts students from outside and inside Kurdistan, and has many non-Kurdish students (Arabic, English, Persian, etc.). Later, it was renamed into Dwarozh Secondary School, and is now only one school where students from local and foreign backgrounds study in the same school.
