= Tigris Secondary School for Girls =

School in Baghdad, Iraq

Coordinates: 33.32780°N 44.28202°E

The Tigris Secondary School for Girls is a convent-style girls' school in the Alawaya district of Baghdad, Iraq. It has some 900 students aged 13–17.

After the 2003 invasion of Iraq former headmistress Sister Clara, who had been removed by the Iraqi Ministry of Education in 1999, due to her liability in private tutoring (al-tadrees al-khusosi) which was forbidden in the educational system of Iraq before the [2003 invasion, was able to return to her post.
