= Infrastructure of Iraq =

Overview of the infrastructure of the Republic of Iraq

Infrastructure of Iraq describes the infrastructure of the country of Iraq. Throughout the history of Iraq, the country's infrastructure, along with its politics and economy, have been affected by armed conflicts; none more serious than the 2003 Invasion and subsequent reconstruction.

== Transport ==
Iraq has 45,550 km of roads, with 38,400 km, of them paved (1996 est.) Iraq has 4,350 km of crude oil pipelines, and 1,360 km for natural gas.

There are about 113 airports. (1999 est.) Major airports include

- Baghdad International Airport
- Basra International Airport
- Mosul International Airport
- Erbil International Airport
- Sulaimaniyah International Airport
- Najaf International Airport

There is significant rail transport in Iraq. In November, 2008, an overground service dubbed the Baghdad Metro began service.

== Energy ==
Baghdad continues to suffer regular power outages. In the hot summer of 2004, electricity was only available intermittently in most areas of the city. According to a member of Paul Bremer's staff, the problems with electricity were exacerbated by a surge in the use of air conditioners which were previously banned by Saddam Hussein.

== Health ==
During the Gulf War of 1991 aerial bombardment caused severe damage to the electric grid that operated the pumping stations and other facilities for potable water delivery and sewage treatment, causing massive problems with Water supply and sanitation in Iraq. The sanctions imposed by the UN at the conclusion of the Gulf War exacerbated these problems by banning the importation of spare parts for equipment and chemicals, such as chlorine, needed for disinfection.

The 2003 invasion of Iraq produced further degradation of Iraq’s water supply, sewerage and electrical supply systems. Treatment plants, pumping stations and generating stations were stripped of their equipment, supplies and electrical wiring by looters. The once-capable cadre of engineers and operating technicians were scattered or left the country. Reconstruction efforts faced a nation with a severely degraded infrastructure.

== Communications ==
The 2003 Iraq war severely disrupted telecommunications throughout Iraq, including international connections. USAID is overseeing the repair of switching capability and the construction of mobile and satellite communications facilities.

Main telephone lines in use: 833,000 (as of 2005)
Number of mobile cellular phones: 9,000,000 (as of 2005)
Domestic telephone network: Repairs to switches and lines have been made. Cellular service is in place since 2004. Cellular service is still spotty in some locations. It is expected to improve further.
USA Today from 2005 about Iraq and its Telecommunications Iraqna, an Orascom Telecom company, led by Shamel Hanafy COO Is the leader of the biggest GSM Cell phone provider in Iraq, also known as Sam Hanafy the American Department of Defense [DoD contractor] Successfully secured and won the exclusivity contract for deploying the telephony and GSM network to the DoD, US Department Of States, and the Coalition Forces

International connections:

- 2 Intelsat satellite earth stations (1 Atlantic Ocean region, 1 Indian Ocean region)
- 1 Intersputnik satellite earth station (Atlantic Ocean region)
- 1 Arabsat satellite earth station (inoperative)
- Coaxial cable and microwave radio relay to Jordan, Kuwait, Syria, and Turkey (the line to Kuwait is probably not operational)

Al Iraqiya (or Iraqi Media Network) is Iraq's main public broadcaster.

Since the overthrow of Saddam Hussein, Internet in Iraq has become commonplace. Uruklink, originally the sole Iraqi Internet service provider, now faces competition from other ISPs, including broadband satellite internet access services from both Middle East and European VSAT hubs. The premier military telecom service provider in Iraq is Ts 2.

== See also ==
- List of schools in Iraq
