= Danielle Mitterrand =

Spouse of the President of France from 1981 to 1995

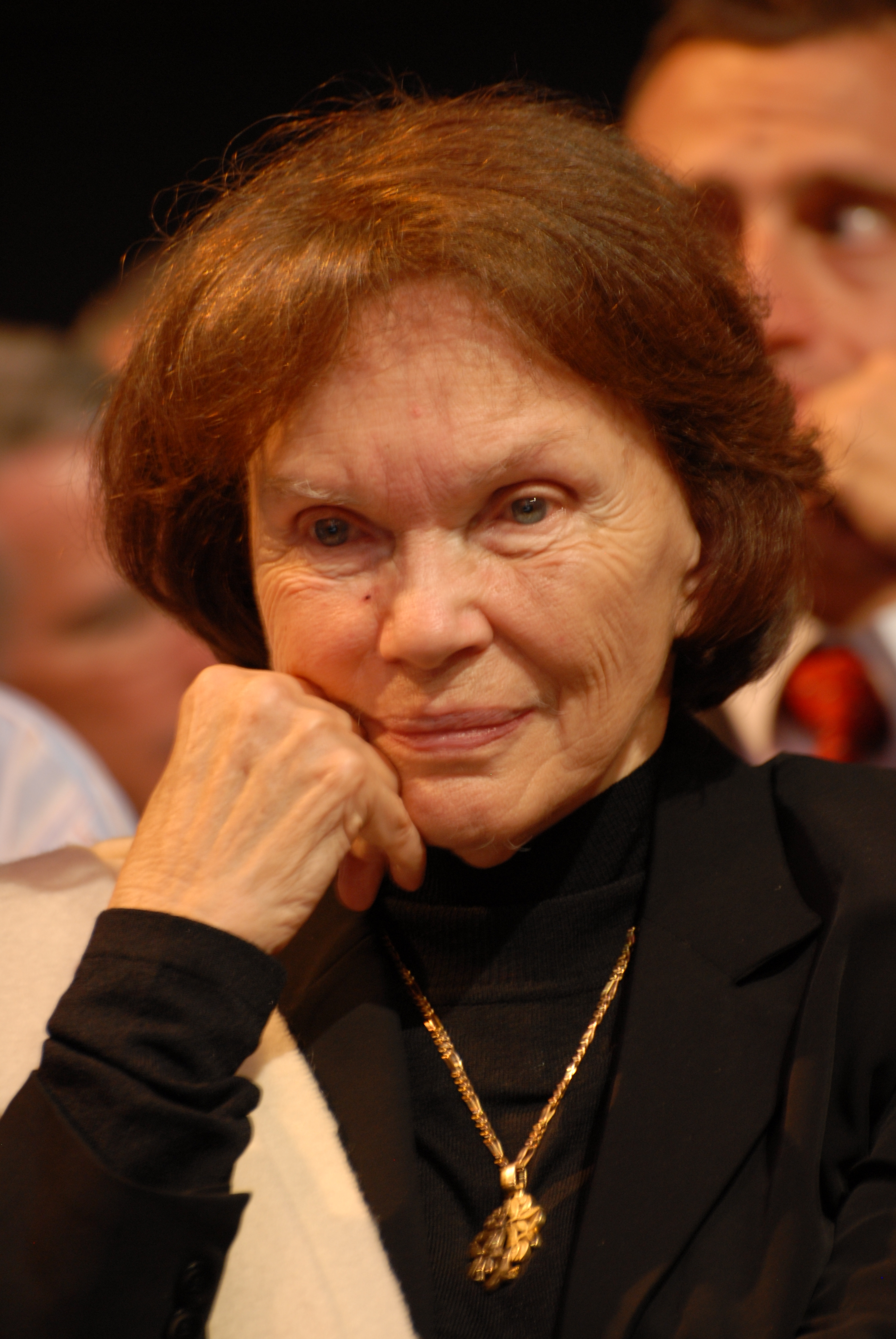
- Mitterrand in 2007

Spouse of the President of France
- In role 21 May 1981 – 17 May 1995
- President: François Mitterrand
- Preceded by: Anne-Aymone Giscard d'Estaing
- Succeeded by: Bernadette Chirac

Personal details
- Born: Danielle Émilienne Isabelle Gouze; 29 October 1924 Verdun, France
- Died: 22 November 2011 (aged 87) Paris, France
- Resting place: Cimetière de Cluny, France
- Spouse: François Mitterrand (m. 1944; died 1996)
- Children: 3, including Jean-Christophe Mitterrand
- Nickname: “The mother of the Kurds/Kurdistan”

Danielle Émilienne Isabelle Mitterrand (née Gouze; 29 October 1924 – 22 November 2011) was the wife of French President François Mitterrand, former liaison officer in the French Resistance, and president of the Fondation Danielle-Mitterrand - France Libertés.

== Life ==
Danielle Émilienne Isabelle Gouze was born on 29 October 1924 in Verdun, in the Meuse. Her father, Antoine Gouze (1885–1958), was a college principal. Her mother, born Renée Flachot (1890–1971), was a teacher. Her parents were secularists, Republicans and French Section of the Workers' International (SFIO) activists.

In 1940, Antoine Gouze refused to list the Jewish students and teachers at his college and was dismissed by the Vichy government. He then moved to Cluny where he gave private lessons. From 1940 to 1942, her family regularly housed members in hiding of the Resistance Combat network, including its leader, Henri Frenay. Her family aided the French Resistance and helped lodge members of the Maquis. Following her sister Christine, she joined the French Resistance when she was seventeen; she was later awarded the Resistance Medal. She also became a liaison officer in the Resistance. She met François Mitterrand there and married him on 28 October 1944, three months after the Liberation.

Mitterrand had three sons: Pascal (b. 1945; died aged two months), Jean-Christophe (b. 1946) and Gilbert Mitterrand (b. 1949).

In 1981, she and her husband met with DAR President General Patricia Walton Shelby and François Lefebvre de Laboulaye, the French Ambassador to the United States, aboard the De Grasse as part of the celebrations for the Bicentennial of the Siege of Yorktown.

She created the France-Libertés Foundation in 1986, when she was First Lady, with the merger of three smaller associations which had been established in 1981.

In July 1992, on her way to Halabja in support of the Kurds, she was involved in a car bomb in Iraqi Kurdistan; though she survived, as did minister Bernard Kouchner, seven people in her convoy were killed, and seventeen others were wounded.

In 1996, Mitterrand was awarded the North–South Prize "for her position in favour of the human rights and, symbolically, to Algerian women, for their daily fight for freedom."

Mitterrand died on 22 November 2011 aged 87 after being hospitalized for fatigue.

== Views ==
Since the 1980s in Turkish and Iraqi Kurdistan, she supported the Kurdish people. She managed to raise awareness amongst the International Community about the human rights violations in Kurdistan. She also supported the Kurdish leader Abdullah Öcalan. She is nicknamed “The mother of the Kurds”, also called “the mother of Kurdistan”, the Kurdistan Region has also granted her the honorary title.

Mitterrand was a longtime supporter of Cuba and its Marxist–Leninist government. She befriended Fidel Castro, Subcomandante Marcos, and the Dalai Lama. However, she was critical of Castro's torturing and killing of Cuban political prisoners. During Fidel Castro's 1995 visit to France, she also helped secure the release of imprisoned Cuban dissident Yndamiro Restano Díaz, who was reportedly freed at her request. She was also a supporter of the ANC and the anti-apartheid movement in South Africa.

She also supported the Sandinistas when her husband gave them military aid in their war against US-backed forces in Nicaragua. She was very critical of Turkey, opposing its accession to the European Union and supportive of the Kurdistan independence movement. She voiced her views in favour of Sahrawi separatists, Mexican insurgent Subcomandante Marcos, and the Tibetan people, among others.

As First Lady, she spoke out against human rights violations, including in countries with which the French government was seeking to maintain good relations; she earned the ire both of the Chinese government and of King Hassan II of Morocco, in particular. Her France-Libertés Foundation provided financial support to local human rights initiatives abroad, and also financed access to medicine and education in poor countries.

She supported a "no" vote in the 2005 French referendum on the European Constitution: "I denounce the power of the economy over people, a system that turns individuals into elements in an economic equation, does not respect the poor and excludes everyone that does not live up to the principle of profitability".

== Works ==
- These men are first our brothers (Ces hommes sont avant tout nos frères), Ramsay, 1996, on the Indians of Chiapas
- Torture in Tunisia: Committee for freedom and human rights in Tunisia (La torture en Tunisie : Comité pour le respect des libertés et des droits de l’homme en Tunisie), Le temps des cerises, 2000

== Honours ==
The French International School MLF Danielle Mitterrand in Iraqi Kurdistan is named after her.

=== Foreign honours ===
- Netherlands : Grand Cross of the Order of the Crown (1991)
- Philippines : Order of Gabriela Silang (11 July 1989)
- Sweden : Commander Grand Cross of the Order of the Polar Star (11 May 1984)

Unofficial roles
Preceded by Anne-Aymone Giscard d'Estaing	Spouse of the President of France; 1981–1995	Succeeded by Bernadette Chirac
