= Reconstruction in Afghanistan =

Reconstruction in Afghanistan refers to the efforts to improve Afghanistan's governance as well as physical buildings and infrastructure following the overthrow of the First Islamic Emirate of Afghanistan by the United States. These efforts involved various groups including supranational organizations, the Afghan government, the US government and other foreign governments, and civilians. These efforts also include training civil administrators, improving essential services and public safety, supporting civil society and self-determination, and promoting the rule of law and economic development.

== Under the Islamic Republic of Afghanistan (2002–2021) ==
=== International efforts ===
The reconstruction process of Afghanistan began in 2002. Many of these projects were supervised by the Provincial Reconstruction Teams. The World Bank contribution is the multilateral Afghanistan Reconstruction Trust Fund (ARTF), which was set up in 2002, by the ideas of Noor Rahman Liwal. There are more than 14,000 reconstruction projects underway in Afghanistan, such as the Kajaki and the Salma Dam. It is financed by 24 international donor countries and has spent more than $1.37 billion as of 2007. Approximately 30 billion dollars have been provided by the international community for the reconstruction of Afghanistan, most of it from the United States. In 2002, the world community allocated $4 billion at the Tokyo conference followed by another $4 billion in 2004. In February 2006, $10.5 billion were committed for Afghanistan at the London Conference and $11 billion from the United States in early 2007. Despite these vast investments by the international community, the reconstruction effort's results have been mixed. Implementation of development projects at the district and sub-district level has been frequently marred by lack of coordination, knowledge of local conditions, and sound planning on the side of international donors as well as by corruption and inefficiency on the side of Afghan government officials.

=== Infrastructure Developments ===
One major development goal was the completion of the Ring Road - a series of highways linking the major cities of Afghanistan.

The highway was a failure. Hundreds of millions of dollars were spent on the Ring Road, unable to be completed due to security issues, poor contractor performance, lack of qualified bidders to work on the road, and lack of contractor interest. The Ring Road remains only 15% complete after work for more than 15 years.

On the provincial and national level, projects such as the National Solidarity Programme, inter-provincial road construction, and the US-led revamping of rural health services have met with more success.

=== United States Efforts ===
The United States poured tens of billions of dollars into the reconstruction effort, establishing the Special Inspector General for Afghanistan Reconstruction (SIGAR) to provide oversight. In September 2015, Former head of SIGAR, John F. Sopko said in connection with the effort, "all I'm seeing is a modus operandi that's woefully out of touch at best, and delusional at worst". He also said, "It seems that time and again, people have to be reminded that Afghanistan is not Kansas". He complained that many people, especially at USAID, design programmes "without considering the fact that you have a tribal government, that you have a criminal element there". He said that although 8 billion dollars had been spent combatting the narcotics trade, he thought the effort overall was an abject failure. More acres are growing opium, more opium is being produced, there are tighter relationships between the opium traffickers and the terrorists (who are getting more money), and there are more Afghan addicts. But American officials consider it a success because they have trained a certain number of narcotics police, prosecutors, et cetera.

Afghanistan was on the rebound after years of conflict had wreaked havoc on the country's infrastructure. The US was collaborating with the Afghan government to develop and implement good economic policies that are long-term, transparent, and predictable. The United States Agency for International Development aimed to improve economic policies that affect the public sector by strengthening the capacity of the Ministry of Finance and the Central Bank, as well as creating an environment that allows the private sector to expand and create jobs and income. According to the U.S. special inspector general for Afghanistan reconstruction report, reveals how most programs were not suited to the complicated circumstances which wasted 20 years and $145 billion of effort "We were devoid of a fundamental understanding of Afghanistan... we didn't know what we were doing." - Douglas Lute. The rehabilitation effort's achievements have been varied. Theres was a lack of coordination, understanding of local conditions, and sound planning on the part of international donors, as well as corruption and incompetence on the part of the Afghan government.

=== Foreign Investment ===
Kazakhstan is providing food and development assistance to Afghanistan. Kazakhstan has delivered $20 million worth food products since 2002 and $50 million in scholarships for Afghan students to study in Kazakhstan. Multiple countries in NATO have also contributed to assistance.

=== Relations with the Taliban ===
According to a lawsuit filed in December 2019 in the D.C. District Court on behalf of Gold Star families, U.S. contractors involved in Afghanistan reconstruction projects, including Louis Berger Group and Development Alternatives Incorporated, made illegal "protection payments" to the Taliban, funding a "Taliban-led terrorist insurgency" that killed or wounded thousands of Americans in Afghanistan. A related lawsuit accused the Iranian government. In 2009, then-Secretary of State Hillary Clinton said that the "protection money" was "one of the major sources of funding for the Taliban."

== Restoration of Taliban Control (since 2021) ==
Following the Fall of Kabul in August 2021 and the withdrawal of coalition forces, the Second Islamic Emirate of Afghanistan was restored by Taliban forces. This coincided with international sanctions and the end of many reconstruction efforts from outside governments. This was further hampered by human rights abuses in the country and supposed relations with Al-Qaeda.

== See also ==
- Investment in post-invasion Iraq
- Nation-building
