= Philip Bloom (businessman) =

American businessman

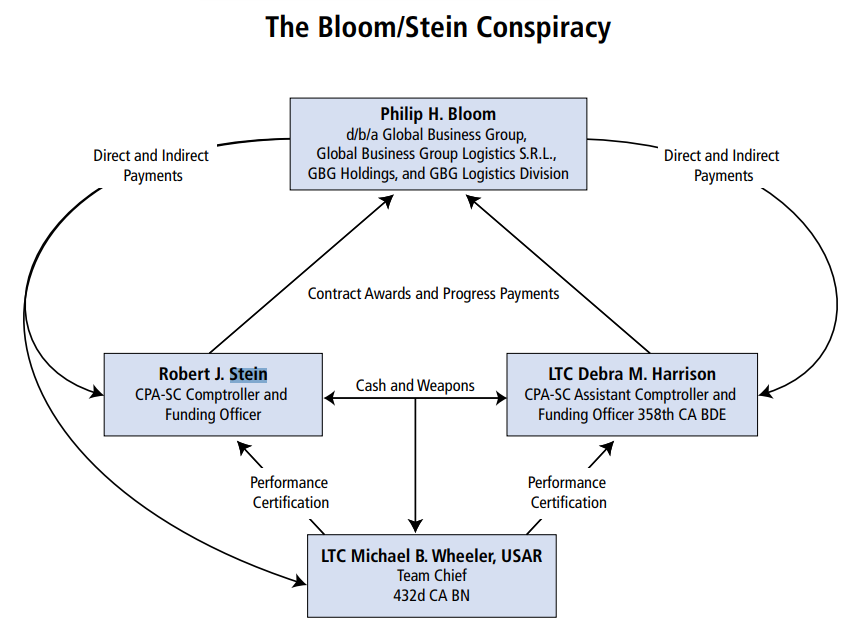

Philip Bloom is an American businessman who pleaded guilty on April 18, 2006 to conspiracy, bribery and money laundering in connection with a scheme to defraud the Coalition Provisional Authority – South Central Region (CPA-SC) during the occupation of Iraq. According to the Sydney Morning Herald Bloom used CPA funds to pay out over $2 million USD in bribes, in cash, real estate, designer cars, watches, and the services of prostitutes he brought to Bagdad. Bloom accepted at least $1 million in bribes and stole a further $600,000 in cash and goods from CPA funds.

At the time the charges were laid this case was described as the first instance of many cases of fraud involving US officials.

Bloom was accused of bribing Lieutenant Colonel Bruce D. Hopfengardner, Lieutenant Colonel Michael Brian Wheeler, Lieutenant Colonel Debra Harrison and a CPA Comptroller and convicted felon named Robert Stein Jr.. Bloom admitted paying Stein and the others more than $2 million in money and gifts in return for them using their official positions to award contracts to Bloom and his companies. Bloom, Stein, and the others also facilitated numerous wire transfers of money that were the proceeds of the fraudulently awarded bids and at least $2 million in stolen money from the CPA, in order to conceal the source and origin of the funds.

All of the funds that paid for Bloom's contracts were from the Development Fund for Iraq—Iraqi oil money, administered on behalf of the Iraqi people, by the United States, during the American occupation. These funds were supposed to be under strict financial controls, overseen by the United Nations. A total of $8.6 million in rigged contracts was identified during the trial.

Bloom's Romanian partners have denied all knowledge of his Iraq activities.

A summary of the Bloom/Stein conspiracy was published by the Special Inspector General for Iraq Reconstruction as an appendix to is October 30, 2006 Quarterly Report to the United States Congress.

On February 16, 2007, Bloom was fined $3.6 million, ordered to pay a further $3.6 million in restitution and sentenced to 46 months in jail with probation following his sentence as part of a deal for cooperating with the investigation.
