= Child labour in Iraq =

Child labour in Iraq has risen due to poverty, violence and forced displacement. Based on a 2016 report by the United Nations Children’s Fund (UNICEF), more than half a million children are working due to decline of family incomes, violence and displacement. The report indicates that the number of children working at the time of the report had increased more than 575,000 since 1990.

== ISIS war ==
Between 2014 and 2016, when ISIS took control of large areas in northern and western Iraq, almost 10 per cent of Iraqi children (more than 1.5 million) were forced to flee their homes due to violence. As a result, 20 per cent of schools were shut down leaving 3.5 million children without access to Education.

== Displacement ==
Another UNICEF report stated that “As of mid-2016, 3.4 million Iraqis - almost 10% of the population - were displaced, and millions more were in need of urgent humanitarian assistance. This massive internal displacement, as well as conflict-related economic decline, put enormous strain on the host communities and strained social systems. Many parties to the conflict engaged in gross human rights abuses, and the number of grave violations against children doubled over 12 months. Many girls who are captured faced gender-based-violence and boys are recruited to fight or work on the front lines.” The Iraqi Observatory for Human Rights (IOHR) had documented many cases of child labour, particularly displaced children. The report emphasised that, displaced children were forced to work to fulfill the basic needs of their families, and at the same time, the employers exploited their vulnerability by paying them very little, taking advantage of their urgent need for income.

== Iraq’s labour law ==
Article 6, chapter 3 of Iraqi Labour Law, states that the minimum age for employment is 15 years old. According to 1989 International Convention on the Rights of the Child, everyone under the age of 18 are considered children, and are entitled to special protection and care.
