= French International School MLF Danielle Mitterrand =

Danielle Mitterrand French School of Erbil
- École française Danielle Mitterrand d'Erbil المدرسة الفرنسية في اربيل قوتابخانەی نێودەوڵەتی فەڕەنسی دانیێل میتێران
- Erbil; Iraq

Information
- Type: K-12 school
- Established: 2009
- Grades: Kindergarten to Grade 12
- Website: https://www.frenchschoolerbil.com/

The Danielle Mitterrand French School of Erbil (French: École française Danielle Mitterrand d'Erbil, Kurdish: قوتابخانەی نێودەوڵەتی فەڕەنسی دانیێل میتێران, Arabic: المدرسة الفرنسية في اربيل) is a private international school in Erbil, Kurdistan Region, Iraq.

The Danielle Mitterrand French School of Erbil currently has a kindergarten, and a school offering grades 1 to 12.

== Background ==
The Danielle Mitterrand French School of Erbil was established in 2009 by Dr. Frédéric Tissot, the Consul General of France in Erbil at the time, for the purpose of improving education in Kurdistan. The school is named in honor of the former First Lady of France, Danielle Mitterrand, who was known for her advocacy and support for Kurdish rights and the Kurdish people. Her involvement and activism on behalf of the Kurds earned her admiration and respect among the Kurdish community.

Dr. Frédéric Tissot, the consul general of France in Erbil, stated that the purpose of the school is to improve education in Kurdistan. The namesake of the school, Danielle Mitterrand, is known as the "mother of Kurds." In 2009 the school had 70 students taught by French teachers. The annual tuition, as of that year, is $3,000 per student. There are English, Arabic, and Kurdish classes available.

The school offers nursery services, and education from kindergarten to high school, covering grades from maternelle (pre-school/kindergarten) to terminale (12th grade). The school's mission is to provide a high-quality education that combines French academic standards with an appreciation for the local culture and values, fostering international understanding and promoting bilingualism among its students.

The school is accredited by the Government of France, which means it follows the French education system and teaches the curriculum nationally set in France. In other words, the students at Danielle Mitterrand French School of Erbil get the same exact education as a student in France.

The school is a member of the largest network of foreign schools in the world, a network of 581 French schools in 139 countries. The Agency for French Education Abroad (AEFE), which is a branch of France’s Ministry of Foreign Affairs, oversees all of these international French schools and ensures that the quality of education is maintained by inspecting the school on a regular basis and offering continuous learning and training to their teachers. The Danielle Mitterrand French School of Erbil maintains its accreditation through this rigorous inspection process performed every year, and throughout the year, by the Government of France.

As the school is a not-for-profit school, the operations are managed and overseen by a volunteer, unpaid Board of Directors composed of highly qualified parents whose children attend the school. The school academics and curriculum are managed directly by an experienced School Director. The Board of Directors, in collaboration with the School Director, ensure a hands-on management of all aspects of the school.

== Kindergarten ==
In the kindergarten, or Maternelle in French, the curriculum is designed to provide a comprehensive, nurturing, and developmentally appropriate educational experience for young children aged 2 to 6.

The school's curriculum focuses on fostering the child's physical, cognitive, social, and emotional growth. It promotes a play-based approach to learning, recognizing the importance of hands-on exploration and active engagement. The curriculum is designed in three stages: Petite Section (PS), Moyenne Section (MS), and Grande Section (GS).

== Primary School ==
The École Primaire, or primary school, plays a crucial role in a child's educational journey. It is the first formal stage of compulsory education and typically caters to children aged 6 to 11 years old.

The École Primaire provides a comprehensive curriculum that focuses on developing core academic skills, fostering social integration, and nurturing the overall well-being of students. Students gradually build upon the foundations laid in Maternelle, further developing their reading, writing, and numeracy skills. The École Primaire curriculum emphasizes critical thinking, problem-solving, and collaborative learning. It aims to provide a balanced education that promotes intellectual growth, social interaction, creativity, and the acquisition of fundamental knowledge.

== Middle School ==
The Collège, or middle school, is a critical stage in a student's educational journey. It typically caters to students aged 11 to 15 and serves as a bridge between primary school and secondary education.

The Collège curriculum provides a comprehensive education that builds upon the foundational knowledge acquired in the École Primaire. It focuses on expanding subject areas, developing critical thinking skills, and preparing students for further academic and personal growth. The curriculum encompasses core subjects such as French language and literature, mathematics, sciences, history, geography, and foreign languages. In addition to these subjects, students also engage in physical education, technology and arts. The Collège curriculum encourages independent learning, research skills, and collaborative projects. It aims to foster a deeper understanding of various disciplines, promote intellectual curiosity, and prepare students for the next stage of their educational journey in the Lycée.

== High School ==
The Lycée (high school) represents the final stage of secondary education, following the Collège. It typically caters to students aged 15 to 18 and prepares them for higher education or vocational pathways.

The Lycée curriculum focuses on providing a comprehensive and specialized education that deepens students' knowledge in various subjects while allowing them to specialize in specific fields. The curriculum includes core subjects such as French language and literature, mathematics, sciences, history, geography, foreign languages, and physical education.

The Lycée curriculum places a strong emphasis on critical thinking, analysis, research skills, and independent study. It aims to prepare students for higher education or entry into the workforce by equipping them with specialized knowledge and skills.

== Graduation ==
Students at Danielle Mitterrand French School of Erbil obtain the French Baccalauréat.

The Baccalauréat is the diploma awarded at the end of the Lycée (Grade 12). It is a high school leaving certificate and a prerequisite for higher education. It is awarded after successful competition of a comprehensive French national examination consisting of a series of written exams that assess students' knowledge and understanding of the subjects they have studied, and oral examinations involving individual presentations.

The Bac is graded on a scale of 0 to 20, with 10 being the minimum passing grade. The final grade is based on the combined scores of the written and oral examinations. A weighted average is calculated based on the importance of each subject in the chosen stream or specialization.

The Bac is highly regarded as a prestigious qualification and is known for its rigorous curriculum and comprehensive assessment. Its recognition extends beyond France, and many universities worldwide acknowledge the academic achievements represented by the Bac.
