= Classical School of the Medes =

- Slemani, Dohuk, Hawler; Iraq

Information
- Type: Private
- Established: 1 January 2001
- Oversight: Servant Group International
- Principal: Mr. Yousif Matty
- Grades: Kindergarten - 12th grade
- Enrollment: 1000 (Slemani), 600 (Dohuk), 1400 (Hawler)
- Language: English, Kurdish, Arabic
- Publication: Median Ink
- Newspaper: Median Ink
- Affiliation: Servant Group International
- Website: Medes School

The Classical School of the Medes (CSM) is a private English-based network of schools operating in the Kurdistan region. The headmaster is Mr. Yousif Matty.

== History ==
CSM began in response to requests from local church and government authorities to establish a school with an English-based curriculum and international training support. The first CSM opened in Slemani in January 2001 and now enrolls 1000 students in kindergarten through 12th grade. A second CSM opened in Dohuk in the fall of 2002 and now enrolls 600 students (K-12). In September 2003, a third CSM campus opened in Hawler, which enrolls around 1400 students (K-12).

== Students ==
Over 95% of the students come from Kurdish Muslim families, with the remainder from Catholic Christian, Orthodox Christian, Evangelical Protestant, and other backgrounds. Many students are children of local government officials and community leaders.

== Model of education ==
CSM schools draw from the classical educational model, which emphasizes traditional subjects such as literature, philosophy, and history, and use an English-based curriculum for most subjects. Supplemental classes are taught in Kurdish and Arabic. Students take the general SAT during their high school years and AP Exams as of 2020. The passing grade for AP tests is 3, and for the SAT, a typical target score is around 1200.

== Staff ==
American staff typically teach one or two courses per semester, with the balance of their time spent on mentoring, community outreach, and building relationships with students, their families, and local community leaders. All curriculum development, international staffing, and training are coordinated through Servant Group International, a United States-based non-profit Christian organization that supports educational initiatives.

== Subjects ==
Educators in the United States compile the program curriculum. Curriculum and supplies are sent annually from the United States to Iraq each summer.

Core subjects include:

- English language
- Kurdish language
- Arabic language
- Mathematics
- Science (usually one branch per school year)
- Humanities (emphasis on Ancient Mesopotamian, Roman, and Greek history)
- Geography (for students in Grades 3, 4, and 5)
- Geography (Maps) (for students in Grades 1, 2, and 6)
- Ethics (or Fairness) (for students in Kindergarten-Grade 2 and Grades 1, 2, 3, 4)
- French and Spanish (Grades 9 and 10)
- Linguistics (Grade 11)
- Advanced Mathematics (Senior year)

== Celebrations ==
- Dress Up Party (October 30 or 31) – A celebration similar to Halloween
- Thanksgiving (last Thursday of November)
- Valentine's Day (February 12 or 14)
- Newroz Party (March 8) – A celebration of the Kurdish New Year
- Spring Picnic (late April)
- Christmas Party (December 25th)
- Easter Party

== Median Ink ==
Median Ink is the second English-language newspaper and the first school newspaper in Kurdistan, run by high school students and sold to the general public. An issue is released every month and covers in-school events as well as notable happenings outside of school. The price of each issue is approximately 1000 IQD.
