= Ministry of Education (Iraq) =

Government ministry of Iraq

Coordinates: 33°22′4″N 44°22′30″E

- Arabic: وزارة التربية

Agency overview
- Jurisdiction: Government of Iraq
- Headquarters: Near Bab Al-Sharqi, Baghdad (Iraq)
- Agency executive: Abdul-Karim al-Jubouri, Minister
- Website: moedu.gov.iq

The Ministry of Education is a federal government ministry of Iraq responsible for education.
