= Azores Summit =

2003 meeting of Portugal, Spain, UK and US heads of state

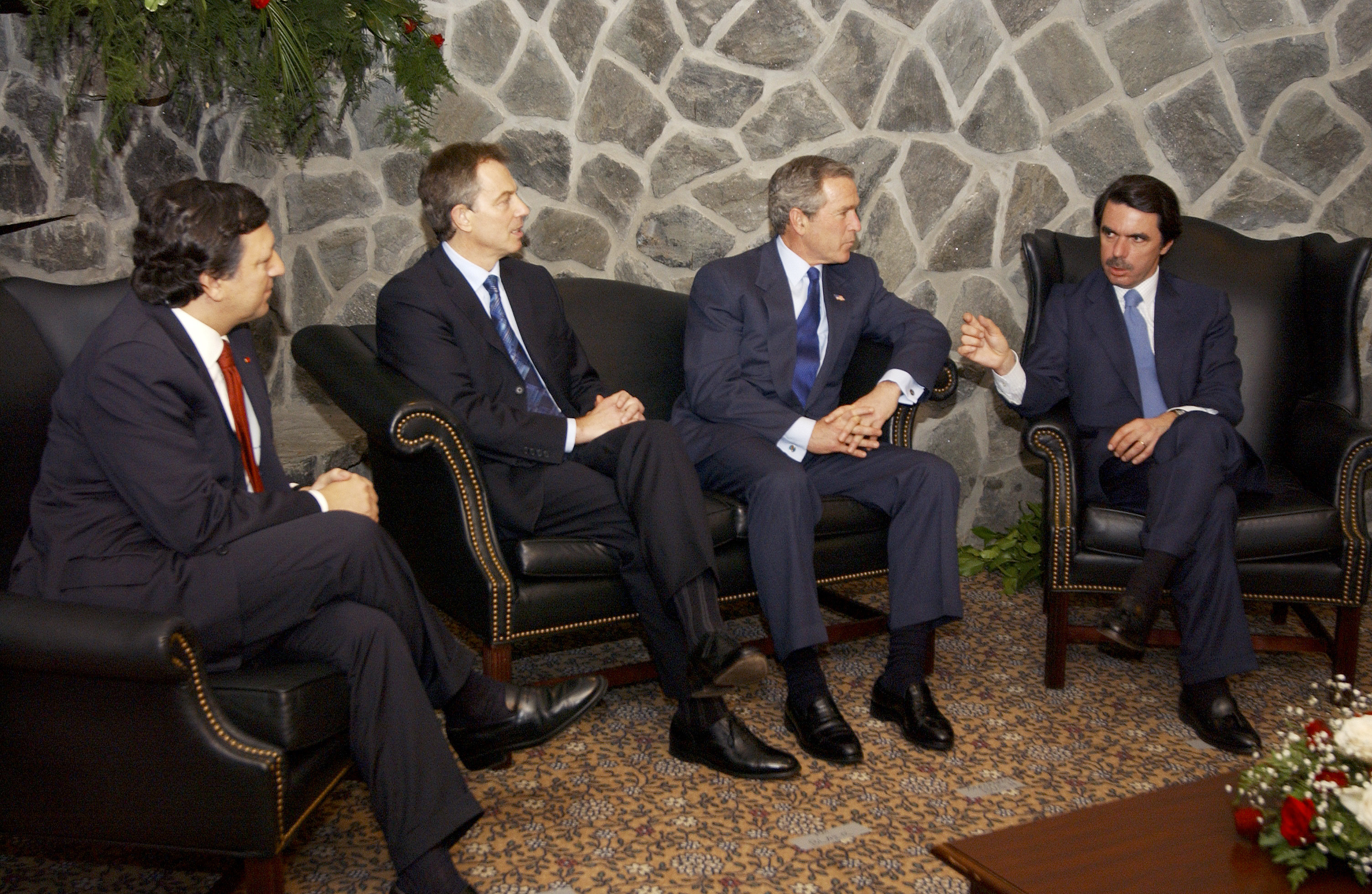
José Manuel Durão Barroso, Tony Blair, George W. Bush, and José María Aznar at the Azores Summit.

The Azores Summit was a meeting held on 16 March 2003 at Lajes Air Base on Terceira Island in the Azores, Portugal, between the heads of government of the United States (George W. Bush), the United Kingdom (Tony Blair), Spain (José María Aznar), and Portugal (José Manuel Durão Barroso, who also served as the host). President Bush was in the Azores for less than 4 hours. The summit lasted approximately one hour.

At the Azores Summit, the decision was made to issue a 24-hour ultimatum to the Iraqi regime headed by Saddam Hussein for disarmament under threat of a declaration of war.

In Spain, the Azores Summit was widely criticized and, according to some experts, it was a turning point that marked the beginning of the fall of the People's Party, which would be further accentuated by the 2004 Madrid train bombings.

The ultimatum finally led to the 2003 invasion of Iraq by an international coalition of countries, without the explicit backing of the United Nations, although they relied on United Nations Security Council resolutions (UNSCR) 1441, 1483, and 1511.

== Statements at the Azores Summit in relation to Iraq ==
The Azores Summit resulted in two statements:

A vision for Iraq and the Iraqi people
This statement argues for the need to liberate the Iraqi people from Saddam Hussein's regime.
Commitment to transatlantic solidarity
The signatories intended to state their particular points of view regarding the common values on both sides of the Atlantic pertaining to democracy, freedom, and the rule of law, and that together they would confront the two threats of the 21st century: terrorism and the proliferation of weapons of mass destruction.

== Consequences ==
The Azores Summit is the prelude to the 2003 invasion of Iraq and its subsequent occupation, as well as the prolongation of the Iraq War until 19 August 2010.

=== The military occupation found no weapons of mass destruction ===
The existence of chemical weapons (weapons of mass destruction) in Iraq, the main argument put forward for the declaration of war, was not proven. The invasion of Iraq has also been linked to the solution of the Arab–Israeli conflict, the new geopolitical strategy of the United States, the large economic oil interests in the area, and a real testing ground for the US military industry, which constitutes a very important part of its gross domestic product.

=== Withdrawal of troops and the end of the war ===
On Friday 27 February 2009, US President Barack Obama announced the withdrawal of US troops on Monday 31 August 2010, although 50,000 soldiers would remain until Saturday 31 December 2011. It would not be until 2015 when Tony Blair would admit that it had been a mistake to invade Iraq.

== See also ==
- United Nations Security Council Resolution 1441
- United Nations Security Council Resolution 1483
- United Nations Security Council Resolution 1511
- Iraq disarmament timeline 1990–2003
- 2003 invasion of Iraq
- Iraq War
- Legitimacy of the 2003 invasion of Iraq

== Bibliography ==
- Hinnebusch, Raymond (1 October 2007). "The US Invasion of Iraq: Explanations and Implications". Middle East Critique. 16 (3). Taylor & Francis: 209–228. doi:10.1080/10669920701616443. ISSN 1066-9922.
- Martínez Selva, José María (2009). "La guerra de Iraq: la mentira del pretexto de las armas de destrucción masiva". La gran mentira: En la mente de los fabuladores más famosos de la modernidad (in Spanish). Madrid, Spain: Grupo Planeta. pp. 106–113. ISBN 9788449322686.
- Mercille, Julien (2010). "The radical geopolitics of US foreign policy: the 2003 Iraq War". GeoJournal. 75 (4). Springer: 327–337. doi:10.1007/s10708-008-9253-6. ISSN 0343-2521. JSTOR 41148401.
- Waxman, Dov (February 2009). "From Jerusalem to Baghdad? Israel and the War in Iraq". International Studies Perspectives. 10 (1). Oxford University Press: 1–17. doi:10.1111/j.1528-3585.2008.00354.x. ISSN 1528-3585. JSTOR 44218575.
