= Iraq Relief and Reconstruction Fund =

United States Congress reconstruction fund

The Iraq Relief and Reconstruction Fund (IRRF) was established by the US Congress on November 6, 2003. It allocated $18.4 billion to rebuild Iraq's infrastructure, which had suffered from years of neglect, sanctions, and war.

As of March 29, 2006, approximately $16.3 billion, or 89%, had been obligated and $11.4 billion had been spent. The fund has come under some criticism due to the slowness with which the allocated money has been disbursed, largely because of the time-consuming US procurement process.

Top construction firm Bechtel was awarded nearly $3 billion dollars between two contracts with USAID through this fund, the first contract was active in 2003-2006, the second 2004-2007. According to a July 2007 report from the Special Inspector General for Iraq Reconstruction, Stuart Bowen, the second contract consisted of 24 job orders, mostly in water and sanitation, but also in power, telecommunications, and buildings.

A budget for the allocation of the $18.4 billion may be found here.

Weekly updates on reconstruction spending are available from www.defendamerica.mil, and from www.usaid.gov.

The duties of the Special Inspector General for Iraq Reconstruction include oversight of expenditures from the Iraq Relief and Reconstruction Fund.

== See also ==
- Financial cost of the Iraq War
- Coalition Provisional Authority
- Program Review Board
- Development Fund for Iraq
- Reconstruction of Iraq
