= United Nations Security Council Resolution 1723 =

UN Security Council Resolution 1723
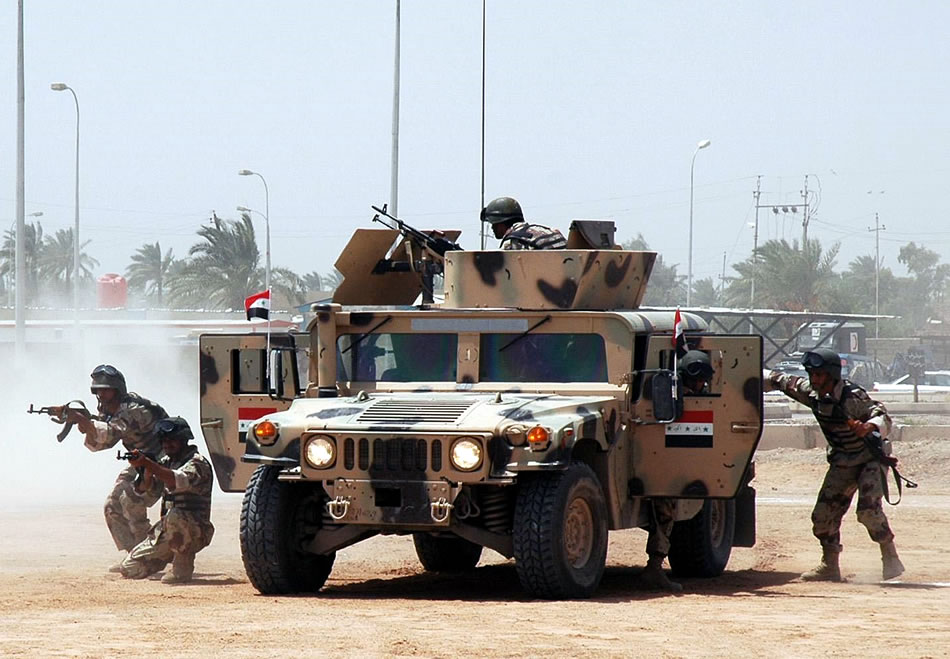
- Iraqi forces
- Date: 28 November 2006
- Meeting no.: 5,574
- Code: S/RES/1723 (Document)
- Subject: The situation concerning Iraq
- Voting summary: 15 voted for; None voted against; None abstained
- Result: Adopted

Security Council composition
- Permanent members: China; France; Russia; United Kingdom; United States
- Non-permanent members: Argentina; Rep. of the Congo; Denmark; Ghana; Greece; Japan; Peru; Qatar; Slovakia; Tanzania

United Nations Security Council Resolution 1723, adopted unanimously on November 28, 2006, after recalling previous resolutions on Iraq, the Council extended the mandate of the multinational force until the end of 2007.

The resolution, sponsored by Denmark, Japan, Slovakia the United Kingdom and the United States, was requested by the Iraqi Prime Minister Nouri al-Maliki in a letter that was attached to the resolution as an annex, along with a letter from the United States Secretary of State Condoleezza Rice confirming the force's willingness to continue.

== Resolution ==
=== Observations ===
In the preamble of the resolution, the members of the Security Council welcomed the formation of a unity government, further welcoming progress made in training Iraqi forces and the transfer of responsibilities in Muthanna and Dhi Qar provinces to the security forces. The text recognised the work of the Iraqi government towards a united and democratic Iraq with respect for human rights; it was vital that dialogue and reconciliation were supported and sectarianism was rejected.

The Council demanded that individuals or groups that deliberately attempt to disrupt the political process lay down their arms and participate. It also addressed issues relating to the betterment of the Iraqi people, including reaffirming the role of the Development Fund for Iraq and International Monetary Fund, the responsibility of the government for co-ordinating humanitarian assistance, and United Nations operations in the country. It was also important that the Iraqi authorities upheld the Vienna Convention on Diplomatic Relations relating to the protection of diplomatic personnel.

=== Acts ===
Acting under Chapter VII of the United Nations Charter, the Council extended the mandate of the multinational force, established by Resolution 1546 (2004) in Iraq until December 31, 2007, to be reviewed by June 15, 2007; it could be terminated at any time by the request of Iraq. At the same time, arrangements provided in Resolution 1483 (2003) for depositing proceeds from export sales of petroleum, petroleum products, and natural gas into the Development Fund for Iraq, and its monitoring by the International Advisory and Monitoring Board, were extended until December 31, 2007.

Finally, the Secretary-General Kofi Annan and the United States were requested to report on a quarterly basis on the progress made by the United Nations Assistance Mission in Iraq (UNAMI) and the multinational force, respectively.

== See also ==
- Iraq War
- List of United Nations Security Council Resolutions 1701 to 1800 (2006–2008)
- United Nations Assistance Mission in Iraq
