= United Nations Security Council Resolution 1637 =

UN Security Council Resolution 1637
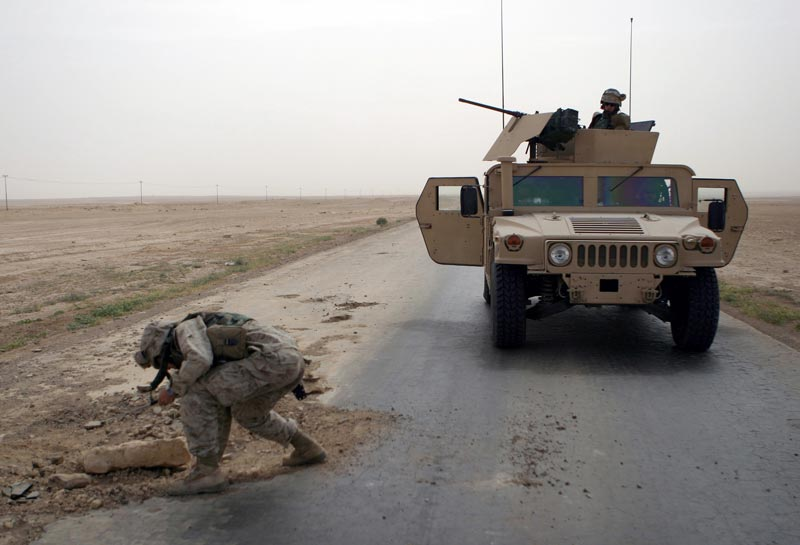
- Soldiers in Iraq
- Date: 8 November 2005
- Meeting no.: 5,300
- Code: S/RES/1637 (Document)
- Subject: The situation between Iraq and Kuwait
- Voting summary: 15 voted for; None voted against; None abstained
- Result: Adopted

Security Council composition
- Permanent members: China; France; Russia; United Kingdom; United States
- Non-permanent members: Algeria; Argentina; Benin; Brazil; Denmark; Greece; Japan; Philippines; Romania; Tanzania

United Nations Security Council Resolution 1637, adopted unanimously on 8 November 2005, after reaffirming previous resolutions on Iraq, the Council extended the mandate of the multinational force until the end of 2006.

The resolution was sponsored by Denmark, Japan, Romania, the United Kingdom and United States.

== Resolution ==
=== Observations ===
Introducing the resolution, the Security Council welcomed the start of a new phase in Iraq and looked forward to the day that the Iraqi forces would be responsible for security, and the mandate of the multinational force in the country could therefore be terminated. It welcomed the commitment of the Iraqi Transitional Government to work towards a democratic nation with respect for political and human rights, and support from the international community. Furthermore, the Council welcomed recent elections and the approval of a new constitution for the country.

The resolution also noted that the government established through the December 2005 elections would be responsible for promoting dialogue and reconciliation in Iraq, and shaping its future. The Council called upon those using violence to lay down their arms and participate in the political process, reaffirming that terrorism would not disrupt Iraq's transition, in accordance with Resolution 1618 (2005). Iraq had requested to retain the presence of the multinational force, established under Resolution 1546 (2004), in order to provide security and humanitarian aid.

=== Acts ===
Acting under Chapter VII of the United Nations Charter, the Council extended the mandate of the multinational force in Iraq until 31 December 2006, to be reviewed by 21 June 2006. It could be terminated at any time by the request of Iraq. At the same time, arrangements for depositing proceeds from export sales of petroleum, petroleum products, and natural gas into the Development Fund for Iraq, and its monitoring by the International Advisory and Monitoring Board, were extended until 31 December 2006.

== See also ==
- Iraq War
- List of United Nations Security Council Resolutions 1601 to 1700 (2005–2006)
- United Nations Assistance Mission in Iraq
