= United Nations Security Council Resolution 1511 =

UN Security Council Resolution 1511
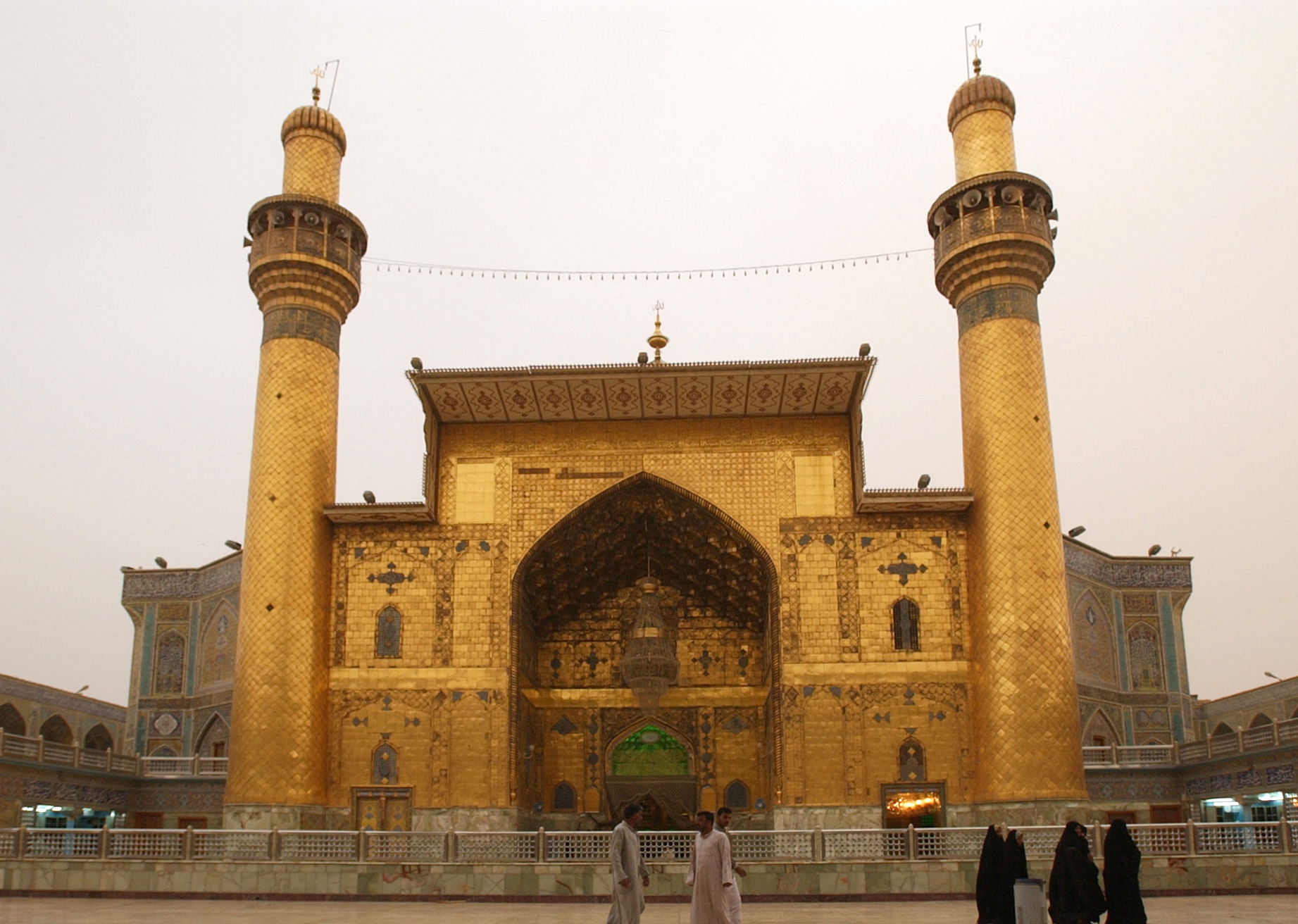
- Imam Ali Mosque in Iraq
- Date: 16 October 2003
- Meeting no.: 4,844
- Code: S/RES/1511 (Document)
- Subject: The situation between Iraq and Kuwait
- Voting summary: 15 voted for; None voted against; None abstained
- Result: Adopted

Security Council composition
- Permanent members: China; France; Russia; United Kingdom; United States
- Non-permanent members: Angola; Bulgaria; Chile; Cameroon; Germany; Guinea; Mexico; Pakistan; Spain; Syria

United Nations Security Council resolution 1511 was adopted unanimously on 16 October 2003, after reaffirming previous resolutions on Iraq, particularly 1483 (2003), 1500 (2003), and Resolution 1373 (2001) on terrorism. The council urged countries to contribute towards a multinational force to maintain security and called for power to be returned to the Iraqi people as soon as possible.

During discussions prior to the adoption of Resolution 1511, Council members were presented with a choice of ending the occupation sooner or approving a longer, temporary occupation; they eventually chose the latter option, effectively authorising the international presence in Iraq. The resolution was drafted by the United States and sponsored by Cameroon, Spain and the United Kingdom.

== Resolution ==
=== Observations ===
The Security Council reaffirmed the right of the Iraqi people to determine their own political future and control their own natural resources. International support in restoring stability and security was essential for the well-being of the people of Iraq. It welcomed an announcement of the Iraqi Governing Council to prepare for a conference to draft a constitution. Meanwhile, bombings against the Jordanian and Turkish embassies, the Imam Ali Mosque and United Nations headquarters in Baghdad, the murder of a Spanish diplomat and the assassination of Aqila al-Hashimi were condemned as attacks against the future of the country.

=== Acts ===
Acting under Chapter VII of the United Nations Charter, the council emphasised the temporary nature of the Coalition Provisional Authority and welcomed the positive response of the international community to the establishment of the Governing Council. It supported the efforts of the Governing Council to mobilise the Iraqi people and determined that the council and its ministers are the principle bodies of the Iraqi interim administration that embodied Iraqi sovereignty. In this regard, the Provisional Authority was asked to return power to the Iraqi people as soon as practicable, while the Governing Council was called upon to provide a timetable for drafting a new constitution and elections. It reaffirmed the role of the United Nations in the country, through the United Nations Assistance Mission in Iraq (UNAMI) and the provision of humanitarian aid and economic reconstruction, and the Secretary-General Kofi Annan was asked to provide any resources requested by the Governing Council.

Additionally, the resolution authorised the creation of a multinational force to contribute towards the security and stability in Iraq by protecting United Nations, humanitarian and Iraqi infrastructure. International contributions were requested for the international force and the Security Council would review the mission within a year of the adoption of the current resolution, while the United States, acting on behalf of the force, was directed to report every six months on progress; little oversight of the activities of the force would take place. The council emphasised the importance of establishing effective Iraqi police and security forces, condemned terrorist attacks in the country and expressed condolences to the families of the victims and the Iraqi people.

The final part of Resolution 1511 appealed to all countries, calling upon them to prevent the transit of terrorists or related funding to Iraq. It required further assistance to the Iraqi people in the reconstruction and development of their economy and infrastructure. Finally, the council called for the establishment of the International Advisory and Monitoring Board, reiterating the need for the Development Fund for Iraq to be used in a transparent manner.

== See also ==
- Iraq War
- List of United Nations Security Council Resolutions 1501 to 1600 (2003–2005)
