= George Wolfe (CPA) =

Chair of the Coalition Provisional Authority

George B. Wolfe was born and raised in Columbia, South Carolina. In December 2023, he retired as a partner in the law firm of Nelson Mullins in Columbia, South Carolina. His practice was focused on representing foreign and domestic companies establishing or expanding operations in South Carolina.

== Career ==
Wolfe began his career in 1977 at the law firm of Wilmer, Cutler and Pickering (now known as Wilmer Hale) in Washington, DC. In 1983, Wolfe returned to his hometown of Columbia, South Carolina and joined Nelson Mullins and has practiced there since that time with the exception of 2001–2004, when he worked at the U.S. Treasury Department. From 1989 to 1993, Mr. Wolfe served as a member of the Investment Policy Advisory Committee (INPAC) to the United States Trade Representative under President George H.W. Bush. From 2001 to 2004, Wolfe served as deputy general counsel and counselor to the secretary for the Department of the Treasury. During this time, he also served two tours in Iraq (2003–2004) as part of the Coalition Provisional Authority (CPA), where he worked on Iraq's financial reconstruction. After leaving the Treasury Department in 2004, Mr. Wolfe served as the first managing partner of the Nelson Mullins' Washington, DC office before returning to the firm's Columbia office in 2007. Wolfe was an employee of the United States government and worked for the Coalition Provisional Authority in 2003 and 2004. Wolfe sat on the CPA's Program Review Board, the committee that made the final recommendation to CPA Administrator Paul Bremer over the $20 billion of contracts the CPA awarded. For its final three months Wolfe served as the board's chairman. As chair of the board he was also the Senior advisor to the Iraqi Ministry of Finance.

The KPMG audit of the Development Fund for Iraq reports that scheduling a meeting with Administrator Bremer had proven difficult. Then Bremer departed from Iraq early, leaving important loose ends dangling—like—the audit.

The auditors looked to Wolfe, the next most senior financial officer after Bremer for cooperation. However Wolfe:

... was unable to acknowledge the fair presentation of the statement of cash receipts and payments, the completeness of significant contracts entered into by the DFI and responsibilities for the implementation and operations of accounting and internal control systems, designed to prevent and detect fraud and error.

Wolfe left government service in 2004, and returned as a partner in the law firm Nelson Mullins. He retired in December of 2023.

== Education ==
Wolfe graduated cum laude from Washington and Lee University in 1973. In 1977, he received his Juris Doctor from the University of Pennsylvania School of Law where he was a member of the Law Review and Order of the Coif.

== Leadership ==
Wolfe has served as president of the South Carolina Economic Developers Association and as chair of the Greater Columbia Committee of 100, the South Carolina Bar Corporate, Banking and Securities Law Section, and a South Carolina public-private sector group that created a strategic plan for the economic development of South Carolina. Wolfe has served as a board member for organization such as the South Carolina Chamber of Commerce, the South Carolina Council on Competitiveness, the Greater Columbia Chamber of Commerce, the Columbia World Affairs Council, and the Columbia Film Society.

== Awards and recognition ==
Wolfe is a recipient of the Order of the Palmetto, the highest civilian award given by a South Carolina Governor. In addition, he received the South Carolina Department of Revenue Lifetime Public Service Award. Wolfe also received the Distinguished Service Award from the U.S. Treasury Department for his service there.
