= United Nations Security Council Resolution 1546 =

UN Security Council Resolution 1546
- Document detailing members of the Iraqi Interim Government
- Date: 8 June 2004
- Meeting no.: 4,987
- Code: S/RES/1546 (Document)
- Subject: The situation in Iraq
- Voting summary: 15 voted for; None voted against; None abstained
- Result: Adopted

Security Council composition
- Permanent members: China; France; Russia; United Kingdom; United States
- Non-permanent members: Algeria; Angola; Benin; Brazil; Chile; Germany; Pakistan; Philippines; Romania; Spain

United Nations Security Council resolution 1546, adopted unanimously on 8 June 2004, after reaffirming previous resolutions on Iraq, the Council endorsed the formation of the Iraqi Interim Government, welcomed the end of the occupation and determined the status of the multinational force and its relationship with the Iraqi government.

The resolution was co-sponsored by the United Kingdom and United States.

== Resolution ==
=== Observations ===
The Security Council welcomed the transition towards a democratically elected Iraqi government and looked forward to the end of the occupation by 30 June 2004 when authority would be held by the interim government. It reaffirmed the right of the Iraqi people to determine their own political future and control their natural resources as well as the importance of support from Iraq's neighbours. The Iraqi Governing Council was dissolved and progress towards implementing arrangements in Resolution 1511 (2003) was welcomed.

The preamble of the resolution also welcomed democratic commitments by the interim government and affirmed the importance of the rule of law, respect for human rights, national reconciliation and free and fair elections. It also stressed the need for all parties to respect Iraq's archaeological, historical, cultural, and religious heritage. There was a role for the United Nations Assistance Mission in Iraq (UNAMI) and the international community in the country's future in accordance with resolutions 1483 (2003) and 1511 (2003).

Furthermore, the interim government requested that the multinational force remain in Iraq and the situation continued to constitute a threat to international peace and security.

=== Acts ===
Acting under Chapter VII of the United Nations Charter, the Council welcomed the assumption of responsibilities and authority by the Iraqi interim government by 30 June 2004 and the end of the occupation and Coalition Provisional Authority. It endorsed a timetable for the political transition, including the convening of a national conference, and holding of elections in early 2005 leading to the establishment of a transitional government and called for their peaceful implementation. The United Nations was asked to assist in areas relating to the drafting of a new constitution, the co-ordination of humanitarian assistance and the promotion of human rights and reforms. The Iraqi government was also working to improve the security forces.

The resolution authorised the multinational force to take all measures to maintain security and stability in Iraq, and welcomed a partnership between the Iraqi government and the force. At the same time, the mandate of the force was extended for a further period of twelve months and would be terminated if requested by Iraq. The Council noted intentions by the United States to create a separate entity in the force to protect the United Nations presence in the country, and the international community was requested to contribute assistance towards the multinational force and to the development of the Iraq.

The Security Council condemned all terrorism in Iraq and reaffirmed the obligations of all states under resolutions 1267 (1999), 1333 (2000), 1373 (2001), 1390 (2002), 1455 (2003) and 1526 (2004). The arms embargo against Iraq would not apply to the government or multinational force and the mandates for the International Atomic Energy Agency and the United Nations Monitoring, Verification and Inspection Commission.

Additionally, the provisions of the resolution stated that funds in the Development Fund for Iraq could be used at the discretion of the Iraqi government upon the termination of the Coalition Provisional Authority in a transparent manner. Finally, the Secretary-General Kofi Annan was requested to report within three months on UNAMI operations in Iraq and on progress made towards elections on a quarterly basis thereafter. The United States, acting on behalf of the multinational force, was also required to report on progress made in similar intervals.

== See also ==
- Iraq War
- Subsequent extensions of the mandate: Resolution 1637, 1723, and 1790
- U.S.–Iraq Status of Forces Agreement
- List of United Nations Security Council Resolutions 1501 to 1600 (2003–2005)
