= United Nations Security Council Resolution 1790 =

UN Security Council Resolution 1790
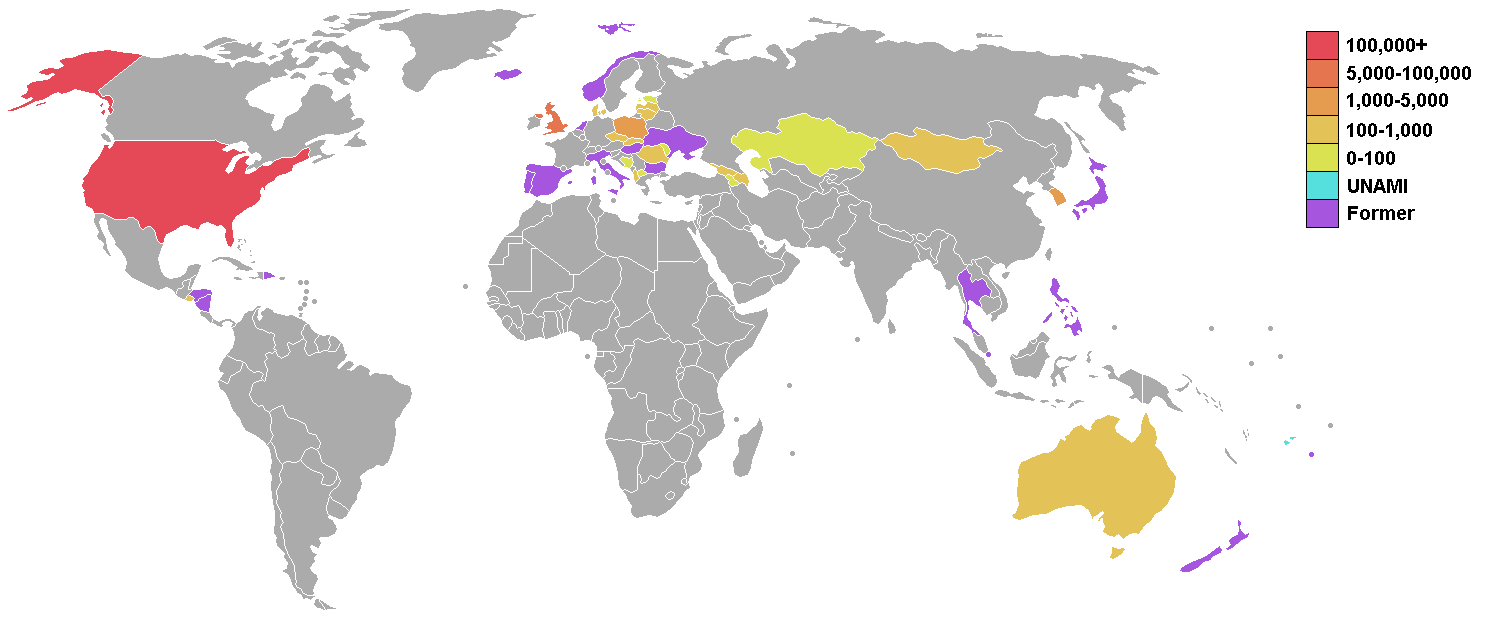
- Multinational force in Iraq countries
- Date: 18 December 2007
- Meeting no.: 5,808
- Code: S/RES/1790 (Document)
- Subject: Extending the mandate of MNF–I
- Voting summary: 15 voted for; None voted against; None abstained
- Result: Adopted

Security Council composition
- Permanent members: China; France; Russia; United Kingdom; United States
- Non-permanent members: Belgium; Rep. of the Congo; Ghana; Indonesia; Italy; Panama; Peru; Qatar; Slovakia; South Africa

United Nations Security Council Resolution 1790 was adopted unanimously by the United Nations Security Council on December 18, 2007, extending the mandate of the multinational force in Iraq until December 31, 2008. The mandate had been established in 2004 by Security Council resolution 1546 and previously extended by resolutions 1637 and 1723.

The resolution was requested by the Iraqi Prime Minister Nouri al-Maliki, who said that this would be the last extension, pending formal talks that would allow the UN mandate to be replaced in 2008 by a new pact between the United States and Iraq regarding the long-term presence of U.S. forces. However, the Iraqi parliament was not consulted regarding the extension of the mandate, despite having passed a binding resolution in June 2007 affirming that any extensions would require the parliament's approval. This led to a hearing before the United States House Committee on Foreign Affairs discussing the renewal.

This was the last UN resolution authorizing the multinational force in Iraq. The U.S.–Iraq Status of Forces Agreement is widely seen as a successor to the mandate.
