= United Nations Security Council Resolution 1618 =

UN Security Council Resolution 1618
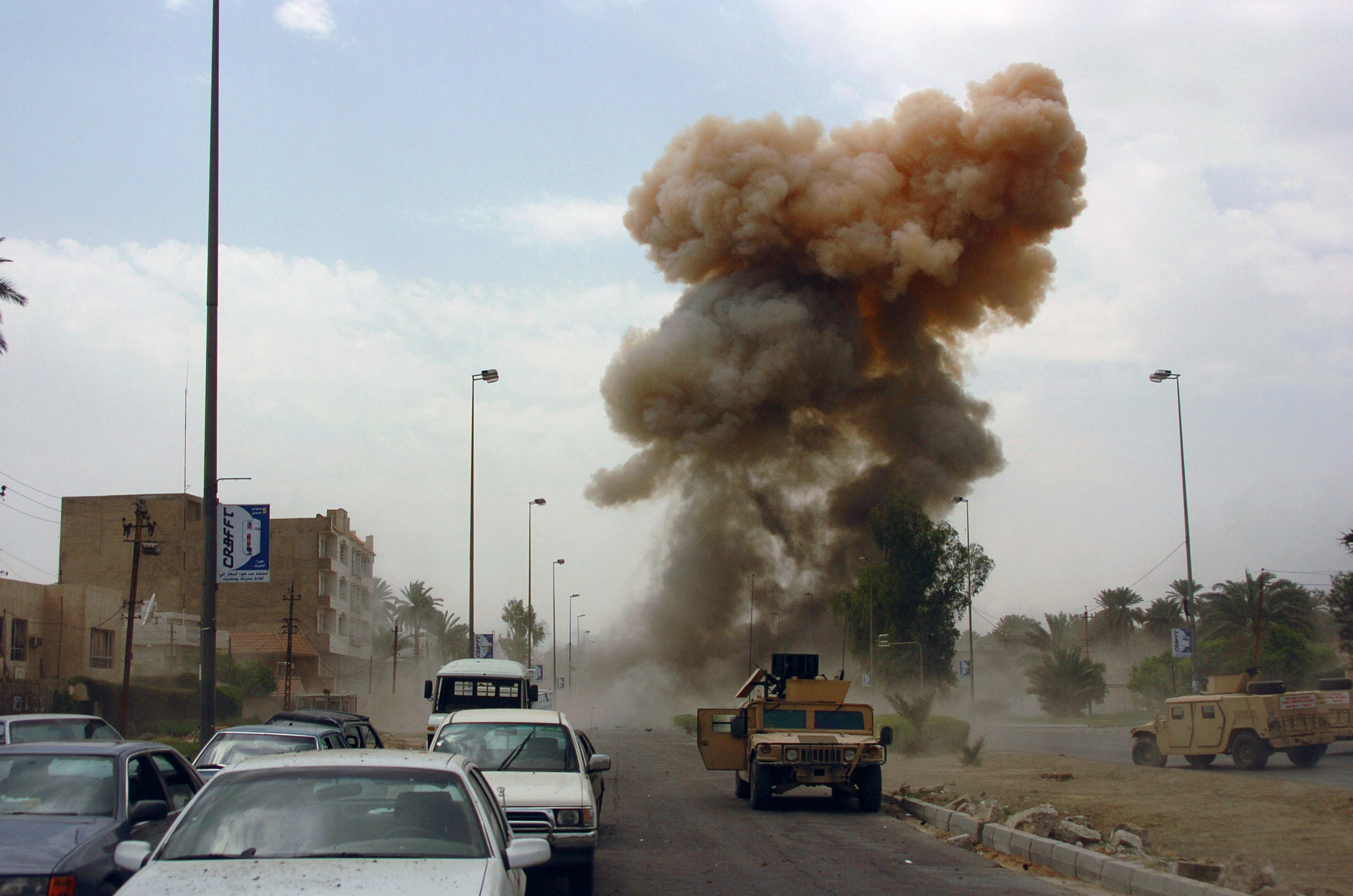
- Car bomb attack in Iraq (2005)
- Date: 4 August 2005
- Meeting no.: 5,246
- Code: S/RES/1618 (Document)
- Subject: Threats to international peace and security caused by terrorist acts
- Voting summary: 15 voted for; None voted against; None abstained
- Result: Adopted

Security Council composition
- Permanent members: China; France; Russia; United Kingdom; United States
- Non-permanent members: Algeria; Argentina; Benin; Brazil; Denmark; Greece; Japan; Philippines; Romania; Tanzania

United Nations Security Council resolution 1618, adopted unanimously on 4 August 2005, after reaffirming resolutions on the situation in Iraq, including Resolution 1546 (2004), the Council condemned terrorist attacks that had taken place in Iraq and expressed its determination to combat terrorism.

== Resolution ==
=== Observations ===
The Security Council began by expressing its support for the people of Iraq during the political transition, despite attacks in the country. It reaffirmed resolutions 1267 (1999), 1373 (2001) and 1566 (2004), the United Nations Charter and the need to combat the threat of terrorism. Steps by the Iraqi government to undertake national dialogue were welcomed.

=== Acts ===
The resolution condemned terrorist attacks that had taken place in Iraq, particularly those that had taken place in recent weeks, and the kidnapping and attacks on foreign diplomats. In this regard, the Council expressed condolences to the victims, their families, and the government of Iraq.

The Council affirmed that terrorism could not affect the political and economic transition in Iraq, and all states were called upon to abide by obligations contained in various resolutions concerning terrorism, including to bring the perpetrators, organisers and sponsors of the attacks to justice. Furthermore, they were also asked to assist Iraq in providing protection to foreign diplomatic and United Nations staff, and other foreign civilians working in the country.

== See also ==
- Iraq War
- List of terrorist incidents
- List of United Nations Security Council Resolutions 1601 to 1700 (2005–2006)
