= International Advisory and Monitoring Board =

The International Advisory and Monitoring Board was appointed to oversee the Coalition Provisional Authority's disbursements from the humanitarian Development Fund for Iraq. When the CPA was authorized to manage the DFI by United Nations resolution 1483. the CPA was obliged to cooperate with the oversight of the IAMB. The IAMB was composed of senior representatives from the United Nations, the Arab Fund for Social and Economic Development, the International Monetary Fund, and the World Bank.

The IAMB had trouble getting co-operation from the Administrator of Iraq, Paul Bremer, and from the CPA. In their final press release before the CPA's authority expired the IAMB wrote:

"The IAMB regrets, despite its repeated requests, the delay in receiving reports on audits undertaken by various agencies on sole-sourced contracts funded by the DFI. In the light of these delays the IAMB decided to commission a special audit to determine the extent of sole-sourced contracts. The IAMB was also informed by the CPA that contrary to earlier representations the award of metering contracts have been delayed and continues to urge the expeditious resolution of this critical issue. Finally, the IAMB noted the delay in completing the audits on the State Oil Marketing Organization (SOMO) and requested the CPA to press for prompt finalization of these."

== See also ==
- Coalition Provisional Authority
- Coalition Provisional Authority Program Review Board
- Development Fund for Iraq
- KPMG audit of the Development Fund for Iraq
