= Coalition Provisional Authority =

2003–2004 transitional US-led government of Iraq

Coordinates: 33°20′N 44°23′E

Coalition Provisional Authority Arabic: سلطة الائتلاف المؤقتة
- 2003–2004
- Flag Seal

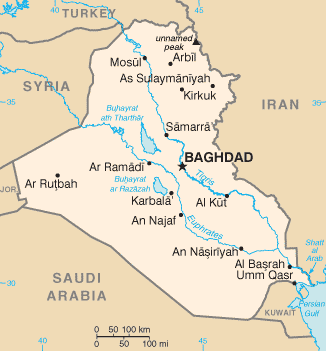
- Status: Provisional government under U.S. military occupation
- Capital: Baghdad
- Government: Unitary state under United States administration
- American Administrator
  - 2003: Jay Garner
  - 2003-2004: Paul Bremer
- American Deputy Administrator
  - 2004: Richard Jones
- President of the Iraqi Governing Council
  - 2003-2004: Mohammed Bahr al-Uloum (first)
  - 2004: Ghazi Mashal Ajil al-Yawer (last)
- Legislature: Iraqi Governing Council
- Historical era: Post–Cold War era Iraq War; War on terror
  - 2003 invasion of Iraq: April 21, 2003
  - Founding of the Iraqi Interim Government: June 28, 2004
Preceded by	Succeeded by
Ba'athist Iraq	Republic of Iraq

Iraq came under United States military occupation following the invasion of the country on 20 March 2003 by U.S.-led Coalition forces that marked the fall of the Ba'athist regime led by Saddam Hussein. As a result, the U.S. formed the Coalition Provisional Authority (Note: Arabic: سلطة الائتلاف المؤقتة, romanized: Sultat Alaitilaf Almuaqata.) (CPA) that served as the transitional government established in May 2003 under the United Nations Security Council Resolution 1483 (2003) and the laws of war, and vested itself with executive, legislative, and judiciary authority over the Iraqi government from the period of the CPA's inception on 21 April 2003 until its dissolution on 28 June 2004.

The CPA was heavily criticized for its mismanagement of funds allocated to the reconstruction of post-invasion Iraq, with over $8 billion of these unaccounted for, including over $1.6 billion in cash that emerged in a bunker in Lebanon. The CPA has been described as a puppet government of the United States.

== History of the CPA ==
The Office for Reconstruction and Humanitarian Assistance (Note: Arabic: مكتب إعادة الإعمار والمساعدة الإنسانية, romanized: Maktab 'ieadat al'iiemar walmusaeadat al'iinsania; Kurdish: فەرمانگەی ئاوەدانکردنەوە و هاوکاری مرۆیی, romanized: Ofîsa Nûavakirin û Alîkariya Mirovî.) (ORHA) was established on 20 January 2003 by the United States government two months before the 2003 invasion of Iraq. It was intended to act as a caretaker administration in Iraq until the creation of a democratically elected civilian government.

Retired United States Army Lieutenant General Jay Garner was appointed as the Director of ORHA, along with three deputies, including British Major-General Tim Cross, in 2003. Upon the dissolution of ORHA and the creation of the CPA, he then became the first chief executive of the CPA. Due to his past military experiences in Iraq during Operation Desert Storm in 1991 and his reconstruction efforts in northern Iraq during Operation Provide Comfort, Garner's credentials and close ties to the U.S. Secretary of Defense Donald Rumsfeld made him an obvious choice for the task. His term, however, lasted only from 21 April 2003 until he was replaced abruptly less than a month later by Paul Bremer on 11 May 2003.

Garner's swift dismissal from his post by U.S. authorities came as a surprise to many within the CPA. In an interview with the BBC program Newsnight Garner publicly stated that his preference was to put the Iraqi people in charge as soon as possible and to do it with some form of elections.

Upon assuming the post of chief executive of the CPA in May 2003, Paul Bremer also assumed the title of U.S. Presidential Envoy and Administrator in Iraq. He was frequently called Ambassador by numerous media organizations and the White House because it was the highest government rank he had achieved (Ambassador to Netherlands). But Bremer was not ambassador to Iraq, and there was no U.S. diplomatic mission in Iraq until June 2004, after the CPA transferred sovereignty to the Iraqi Interim Government. At the CPA, Bremer moved quickly to install opaque and corruption-prone methods for the withdrawal and transportation of extremely large amounts of cash often transported from the US to Iraq by C-17 transport plane.

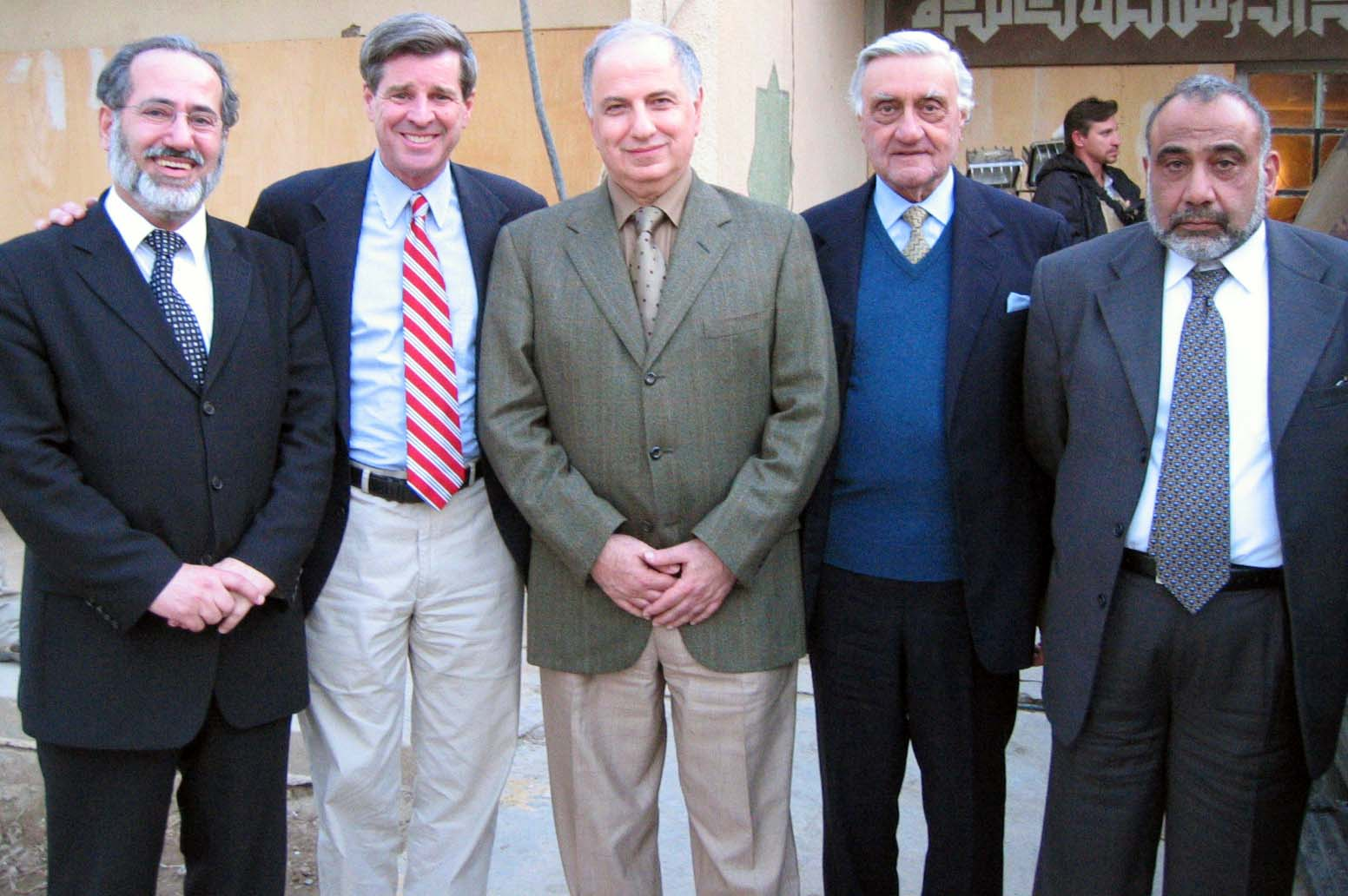
Paul Bremer (second from left) and four members of the Iraqi Governing Council; Mowaffak al-Rubaie, Ahmed Chalabi, Adnan Pachachi, and Adil Abdul-Mahdi (left to right)

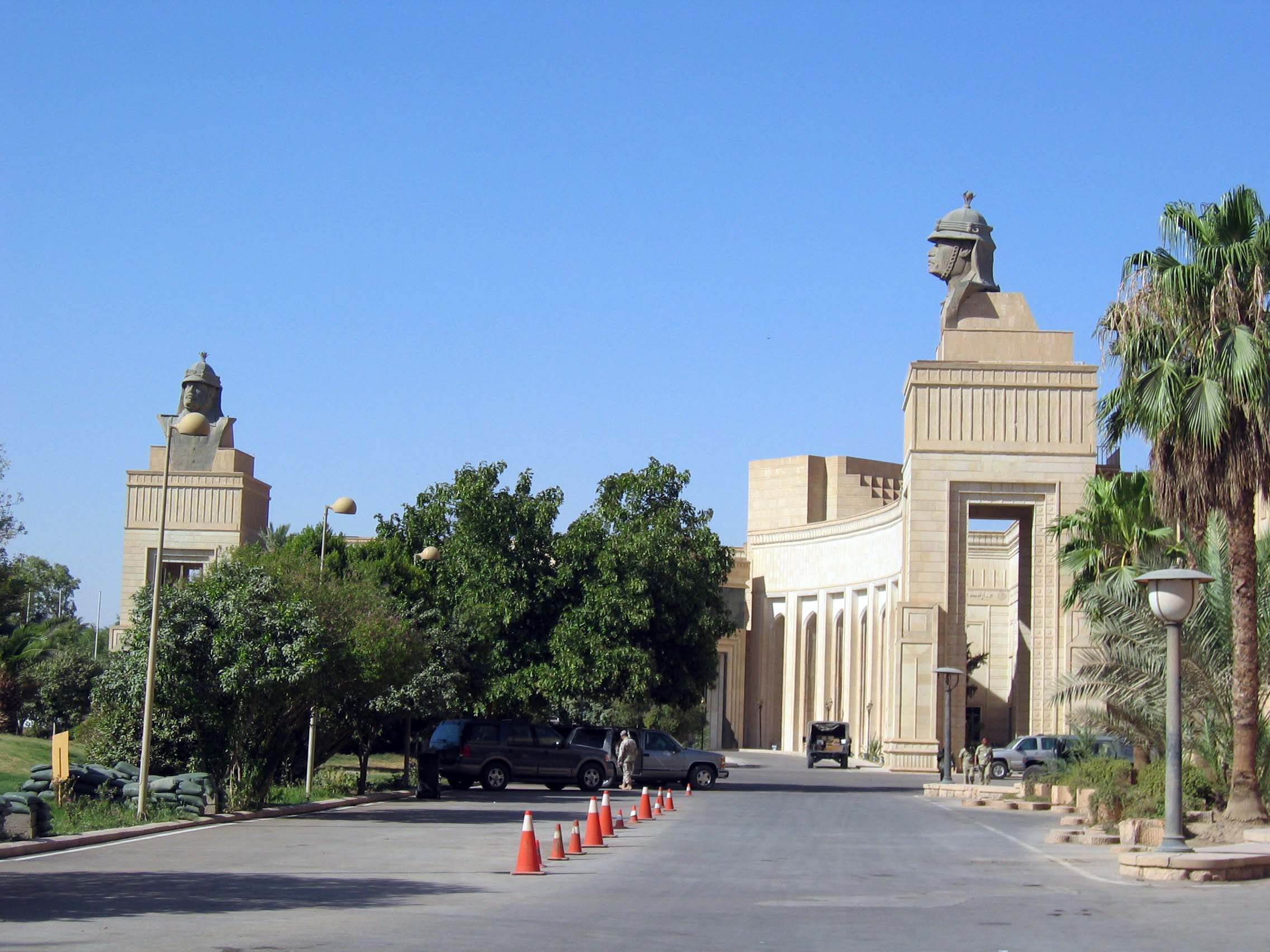
Iraq's Republican Palace in Baghdad under CPA occupation in August 2003.

The CPA was created and funded as a division of the United States Department of Defense, and as Administrator, Bremer reported directly to the Secretary of Defense. Although troops from several of the coalition countries were present in Iraq at this time, the United States Central Command (USCENTCOM) was the primary military apparatus charged with providing direct combat support to the CPA to enforce its authority during the occupation of Iraq.

While many of Saddam Hussein's ornate palaces were looted in the days immediately following the invasion, most of the physical structures themselves survived relatively intact. It is in these numerous palaces situated throughout the country that the CPA chose to set up office in order to govern. Several of these palaces were retained by the U.S. government even after the transition of power back to the Iraqi people. The administration was centered in a district of Baghdad known as the Green Zone, which eventually became a highly secure walled-off enclave.

The CPA was also responsible for administering the Development Fund for Iraq during the year following the invasion. This fund superseded the earlier UN Oil-for-food programme, and provided funding for Iraq's wheat purchase program, the currency exchange program, the electricity and oil infrastructure programs, equipment for Iraq's security forces, Iraqi civil service salaries, and the operations of the various government ministries.

The first act of the CPA under Bremer, Coalition Provisional Authority Order 1, was to order the de-Ba'athification of Iraqi society. On 23 May, Coalition Provisional Authority Order 2 formally disbanded the Iraqi army, as well as other public servants including nurses and doctors and eventually led to the direct unemployment of more than 500,000 Iraqi citizens. On 22 July 2003, the CPA formed the Iraqi Governing Council and appointed its members. The Council membership consisted largely of Iraqi expatriates who had previously fled the country during the rule of Saddam Hussein and also with many outspoken dissidents who had been persecuted by the former Ba'athist regime. The CPA under Bremer then went on to privatise and sell off publicly owned assets and companies to multinational companies, whilst setting about issuing unilaterally developed decrees such as Order 37 and Order 39, which reduced Iraq's corporation tax from 40% to 15% and allowed foreign entities to enjoy 100% ownership of Iraqi assets.

Though still subordinate to the CPA, the Iraqi Governing Council had several key responsibilities of its own: appointing representatives to the United Nations, appointing interim ministers to Iraq's vacant cabinet positions, and drafting a temporary constitution known as the Transitional Administrative Law (TAL), which would be used to govern Iraq until a permanent constitution could be written and approved by the general electorate.

In the late afternoon of 14 December 2003, the CPA held a press conference at the Iraqi Forum convention center within Baghdad's Green Zone to announce that former President of Iraq Saddam Hussein had been taken into custody the previous night from a foxhole in a town near Saddam's home town of Tikrit, Iraq. Present at the announcement was Lieutenant General Ricardo Sanchez of the U.S. Army, Administrator Bremer, members of the British and American intelligence agencies, several members of the Iraqi Governing Council, and a large room full of journalists representing news organizations from around the world. At the same time, diplomat Paul Bremer made his announcement of Saddam's capture, saying "Ladies and gentlemen, we got him."

In order to defeat possible insurgent planning and under pressure from the Bush White House which wanted the occupation to end by the 2004 presidential election, the CPA transferred power to the newly appointed Iraqi Interim Government at 10:26 AM local time on 28 June 2004. The transfer of power was originally scheduled for 30 June 2004, but because of a concern that the transfer would lead to insurgent attacks the ceremony was held, unannounced, two days ahead of schedule. The transfer took place behind closed doors with little fanfare. With the CPA disbanded, Bremer left Iraq that same day.

The United States hoped that Iraq could be reconstructed and democratized in much the same way as Japan and Germany were after the Second World War, using them as "examples or even models of successful military occupations."

== Structure of the CPA ==
The CPA's structure was divided into four geographic regions. CPA North was headquartered in the northern Iraqi city of Erbil, CPA Central in Baghdad at Saddam's former Republican Palace, CPA South Central in the Iraqi city of Hillah near the ruins of Babylon and CPA South in the southern Iraqi city of Basra. Each region operated semi-autonomously, and all four had the same common goals for reconstruction of the country. Throughout the existence of the CPA, the security situation and levels of civil unrest throughout the country varied by region, and these variances were reflected in the different levels of program successes within the CPA divisions.

=== Non-government organizations and private charities and the CPA ===
==== Role of the International Advisory and Monitoring Board (IAMB) ====
United Nations resolution 1483 transferred the authority to authorize expenditures from Iraq's oil revenue from the United Nations to the Coalition Provisional Authority—under certain conditions, including:

- The expenditures were made in an open, transparent manner.
- The expenditures were subject to the supervision of a blue ribbon panel of international financial experts, the IAMB.
- Spending decisions were to be made with meaningful Iraqi input.

The International Advisory and Monitoring Board consisted of senior financial experts from the United Nations, the International Monetary Fund, the World Bank and the Arab Fund for Social and Economic Development.

The IAMB had serious concerns over the CPA's lack of transparency and lack of adequate financial controls, which were never resolved. The IAMB still exists and is playing a role in the investigations into the CPA's financial management.

=== CPA Program Review Board ===
The Program Review Board (PRB) was an eleven-member board that consisted of ten staff members from the CPA and one member of the Iraqi Governing Council. The chair of the board was also the CPA's senior advisor to the Iraqi Ministry of Finance.

It was the board's responsibility to review and make recommendations to the CPA administrator on which contracts should be awarded. In order to ensure transparency, all key discussions regarding the pros and cons of the programs under consideration were to be made public. The CPA administrator was supposed to make decisions on the awarding of contracts only after receiving a recommendation from this committee.

The Notes on Internal Control from KPMG's audit of DFI expenditures was particularly critical of PRB record-keeping's failing to fulfill the CPA's transparency obligation. In particular:

- Meetings were held in which attendance was not recorded.
- Meetings were held in which decisions were made in the absence of quorums.
- The Program Review Board never recorded the motions to approve expenditures, who seconded motions, or which members were for or against those motions.
- In the 43 meetings held in 2003, the single Iraqi member of the board attended only two meetings.
- The minutes failed to contain sufficient detail for readers to understand why programs were approved.
- Program decisions that had been tabled were later approved informally outside the meetings, with no recording of the reasoning behind the decision.
- The board chair refused to certify the accuracy of the Board's bookkeeping.

== Privatization of Iraq's economy ==
Prior to US occupation, Iraq had a centrally planned economy. Among other things, it prohibited foreign ownership of Iraqi businesses, ran most large industries as state-owned enterprises, and imposed large tariffs to keep out foreign goods. After the invasion of Iraq, the CPA quickly began issuing many binding orders privatizing Iraq's economy and opening it up to foreign investment.

CPA Order 39, entitled "Foreign Investment," provided that "A foreign investor shall be entitled to make foreign investments in Iraq on terms no less favorable than those applicable to an Iraqi investor," and that "[t]he amount of foreign participation in newly formed or existing business entities in Iraq shall not be limited...." Additionally, the foreign investor "shall be authorized to... transfer abroad without delay all funds associated with its foreign investment, including shares or profits and dividends....". Critics assert that the CPA drastically altered Iraq's economy, allowing virtually unlimited and unrestricted foreign investment and placing no limitations on the expatriation of profit. These policies were in accord with international standards on foreign direct investment to which most of the richer countries adhered to at the time. The order concluded, "Where an international agreement to which Iraq is a party provides for more favorable terms with respect to foreign investors undertaking investment activities in Iraq, the more favorable terms under the international agreement shall apply." According to critics, this order was designed to create as favorable an environment for foreign investors as possible, thereby allowing American and multinational corporations to dominate Iraq's economy. Others argue the CPA considered free market reform essential for Iraq's oil wealth to generate sustainable growth and development, instead of consigning Iraq to a resource trap by maintaining the laws of the previous totalitarian regime.

CPA Order 17 granted all foreign contractors operating in Iraq immunity from "Iraqi legal process," effectively granting immunity from any kind of suit, civil or criminal, for actions the contractors engaged in within Iraq. CPA Order 49 provided a tax cut for corporations operating within Iraq. It reduced the rate from a maximum of 40% to a maximum of 15% on income. Corporations working with the CPA were exempted from owing any tax. CPA Order 12, amended by Order 54, suspended all tariffs, thus removing the advantage that domestic Iraqi producers had over foreign producers. However, a 5% "reconstruction levy" on all imported goods was later reimposed to help finance Iraqi-initiated reconstruction projects.

CPA Order 57 provided for the appointment of "Inspectors General" to operate within each Iraqi government ministry, for the purposes of rooting out corruption. These Inspectors General were to be "appointed to a 5-year term by the Administrator [Paul Bremer]," and were given sweeping powers "to conduct investigations, audits, evaluations, inspections, and other reviews...." Critics contend this is a mechanism for ensuring continuing American influence in Iraqi governance even after the transfer of all sovereignty to the country.

=== Legitimacy under international law ===
Critics contend that the controversial policies are fundamentally anti-democratic, or illegal under international law, because significant economic reform can only be legitimate if passed initially by an elected Iraqi government free of foreign occupation and domination, and because an occupying power is prohibited from rewriting the laws of the occupied country.

The CPA argued that imposing Order 39 was permitted under Resolution 1483, because it required the CPA to "promote the welfare of the Iraqi people through the effective administration of the territory," and to create "conditions in which the Iraqi people can freely determine their own political future." Proponents of this position state Resolution 1483 necessarily requires radical economic restructuring, so it allowed an exception to international law regarding occupation. However, others point out that Resolution 1483 "calls upon all concerned to comply with international law including in particular the Geneva Conventions of 1949", which would require an occupying force to respect the laws in force in the country unless absolutely prevented.

== Criticism of financial management ==
The numbers are so large that it doesn't seem possible that they're true. Who in their right mind would send 363 tonnes of cash into a war zone?

— Henry Waxman

In May 2003, the CPA took over the responsibility for administering the Development Fund for Iraq (DFI). Established from the earlier UN oil-for-food program, the CPA was authorized to manage the DFI, which took in approximately $20 billion in the year after the invasion. The CPA also administered $18.4 billion that the United States Congress allocated for Iraqi reconstruction in November 2003, known as the Iraq Relief and Reconstruction Fund (IRRF). By June 2004, the CPA had spent, or allocated, $19.1 billion of the DFI funds—while spending only $400 million from the IRRF. Critics suggest that Bremer selectively spent from the DFI because it was more free from accounting oversight by the Government Accountability Office (GAO).

This balance between DFI and IRRF expenditures might be justifiable by the argument that the IRRF was not intended to finance the Iraqi government ministries or the Public Distribution System (state food rations from the Oil-for-food program), which the DFI was intended to cover. The $18.4 billion authorized by the U.S. congress was intended to finance large reconstruction projects such as power and sewage plants, not to provide the day-to-day operating expenses of the Iraqi government. Expenditure on the IRRF projects could be seen as delayed by the projects being in their planning and early site preparation stages and it could be said that it is not surprising that little money had been disbursed at that point, or that so much of the Development Fund for Iraq had been expended as that fund was the primary source of revenue the Iraqi government had. However, by reviewing reports from Special Inspector General for Iraq Reconstruction (SIGIR) and other reviews and audits, it becomes clear that DFI funds were expended on projects that clearly would have been appropriate for management under IRRF. What has been troubling to auditors and inspectors general is that large amounts of DFI funding is as yet unaccounted for and was expended in reconstruction projects that failed to provide a return on investment for the Iraqi people. By funding projects under DFI the CPA avoided legal requirements to comply with US Federal Acquisition Regulations (USFARS) as required for the administration of IRRF and other US taxpayer provided funding. It is also pertinent that expenditures under IRRF were also not administered strictly according to USFARS thereby causing severe waste, fraud and abuse as documented by SIGIR and other auditing agencies.

=== Audits of the CPA's expenditures of Iraqi funds ===
When authority to manage the revenue from Iraq's oil on behalf of the Iraqi people through United Nations resolution, that authority was transferred under certain conditions.

- The funds were to be managed in an open, transparent fashion.
- The CPA was to submit to oversight from the International Advisory and Monitoring Board, a blue ribbon panel of senior international banking experts.

The IAMB tried to insist on certain financial controls, with limited success.

With input from the IAMB accounting firm KPMG was appointed to audit the CPA's expenditures from the DFI.

On 20 June 2005 the staff of the Committee on Government Reform prepared a report for Congressman Henry Waxman on the CPA's expenditures from the DFI that raised additional causes for concern. Further criticism was leveled at the CPA when it was revealed that $12 billion of cash had been delivered by C-130 planes on shrinkwrapped pallets of $100 bills. The cash deliveries were described in a memo prepared for the United States House Committee on Oversight and Government Reform, which concluded that "Many of the funds appear to have been lost to corruption and waste.... Some of the funds could have enriched both criminals and insurgents...." Henry Waxman, the chair of the House committee commented, "Who in their right mind would send 363 tons of cash into a war zone?" A single flight to Iraq on 12 December 2003 which contained $1.5 billion in cash is said to be the largest single Federal Reserve payout in US history according to Henry Waxman.

In 2011, a new American audit found that almost all of the missing $6.6 billion had been transferred to the Central Bank of Iraq. Special Inspector General for Iraq Reconstruction Stuart Bowen said that "Any doubts about how the money was handled after it left U.S. control is an Iraqi -- not U.S. government -- question".

== Human Rights under the CPA ==
Human rights under the CPA and American occupation suffered. During the counter-insurgency, US soldiers were reported of executing wounded or captured rebels, using excessive force against civilians and forcing civilians into battle zones, resulting in what Mabon was the breakdown of Iraqi social fabric. The Iraqi Interim Government created by the CPA was authoritarian. It limited public gatherings, allowed surveillance of communications, the closure of roads, sea lanes, air space, and wide-reaching stop and search powers. The justice system under the CPA was also criticized, including for instituting the death penalty for a variety of crimes such as drug trafficking. It also faced criticism due to a lack of access to lawyers, and no requirement that guilt be proved beyond a reasonable doubt. It was also common for defendants to be tortured to force a confession.

== Reconstruction ==
New Iraqi flag proposed by the Iraqi Governing Council in 2004. It was abandoned after widespread criticism that its colors and motifs resembled those of the flag of Israel too closely.

Although the CPA awarded contracts for essential reconstruction to American firms, some critics claim those firms did relatively little work. Bechtel, for instance, was awarded the contract to repair the Iraqi sewage and drinking water plants. Yet as of 2019, many Iraqis remain without safe drinking water or adequate supplies of electricity. Coalition military forces were too heavily tasked to provide requisite security for all contractors in Iraq. Contract funds therefore had to be partially shifted from reconstruction activities to meet security requirements that had not been envisioned when the contracts were initially let. Moreover, progress in reconstruction frequently faced setbacks due to insurgency activities designed to disrupt rebuilding of the infrastructure. This insurgent activity significantly slowed reconstruction and required adjustment of project goals due to funds consumed by providing necessary security in excess of that originally planned.

According to USAID, as of October 2003, peak electrical generation had reached pre-war levels of 4,500 MW, and they were then collaborating with Bechtel as well as the Iraqi Interior Ministry and others on some 2,000 MW of projected capacity. The CPA set a goal of 6,000 MW generation capacity for the summer of 2004, which has never been reached. Peak generation capacity of 5,365 MW was achieved in August 2004, six weeks after the transfer of sovereignty. Current generation stands at approximately 13,000 MW. Weekly updates and financial summaries are provided by USAID's Iraq homepage as currently as is possible.

== Administrators of the CPA ==
- Jay Garner (21 April 2003 – 12 May 2003)
  as Director of the Office for Reconstruction and Humanitarian Assistance
- Paul Bremer (12 May 2003 – 28 June 2004)
  - Richard Jones (U.S. diplomat), Deputy Administrator
  - Rear Admiral David J. Nash, U.S. Navy (ret.), Director of the Program Management Office
  - Major General Ronald L. Johnson, U.S. Army, Deputy Director of the Program Management Office
  - Lawrence Crandall, U.S. Agency for International Development, Deputy Director of the Program Management Office
  - Stuart W. Bowen Jr., Inspector General of the Program Management Office
  - Rear Admiral Larry L. Poe, U.S. Navy (ret.), Deputy Inspector General of the Program Management Office
- Sir David Richmond

== See also ==
- United Nations Security Council Resolution 1483
- Iraq Relief and Reconstruction Fund
- Reconstruction of Iraq
- Provisional governments
- Development Fund for Iraq
- Coalition Provisional Authority Program Review Board
- International Advisory and Monitoring Board
- KPMG audit of the Development Fund for Iraq
- National Transitional Council, former transitional government in Libya from 2011 until 2012.
- Syrian transitional government, the current transitional government in post-Ba'athist Syria since 2024

== Notes ==
Preceded by Saddam Hussein; President	Presidency of Iraq; 9 April 2003 – 28 June 2004	Succeeded by Ghazi Mashal Ajil al-Yawer; Interim President
Preceded by Government of Saddam Hussein	Government of Iraq; 21 April 2003 – 28 June 2004; With: Iraqi Governing Council	Succeeded by Iraqi Interim Government
