= Coalition Provisional Authority Program Review Board =

The Coalition Provisional Authority Program Review Board was composed of the senior personnel of the Coalition Provisional Authority, charged with the responsibility to review and make recommendations about the awarding of contracts to the administrator of the authority, Paul Bremer.

The board recommended the awarding of more than 800 contracts.

It had the authority to recommend expenditures from both the Development Fund for Iraq, which the Coalition Provisional Authority (CPA) administered in trust on behalf of the Iraqi people, and the Iraq Relief and Reconstruction Fund, which the CPA administered on behalf of the American people.

The expenditures from the Development Fund for Iraq that the board recommended to CPA Administrator Bremer were made under obligations the Coalition undertook under United Nations resolution 1483. They included making sure that expenditures were administered in an open and transparent manner.

According to the KPMG audit of the Development Fund for Iraq expenditures, the board routinely failed to properly document its decisions.

== Voting members of the Program Review Board ==
- George Wolfe Chairman/Director Office of Management and Budget
- Hazim Al Said Iraq Ministry of Finance
- Chris Milligan USAID
- Victoria Wayne Director, Office of Operations & Infrastructure
- Dean Pittman Governance
- Neil Mules Representative of the Australian Government
- William Block Economic and Development Policy
- Neil Hawkins Council for International Cooperation
- Behnam Puttrus Iraq Ministry of Planning and Development Cooperation
- Fred Smith Deputy Senior Advisor for the Office of Security Affairs
- Teddy Bryan USAID
- Col Frank Boynton Director, Office of Operations & Infrastructure
- COL William Ford Coalition Joint Task Force – 7, Comptroller
- Yusaf Samiullah Representative of the United Kingdom Government
- Chris Soares Economic and Development Policy
- Dr. Edgar Rodrigo Iraq Ministry of Planning and Development Cooperation
- Lt Col Jim Reitzel Coalition Joint Task Force – 7, Comptroller
- Lindy Cameron Representative of the United Kingdom Government
- Frederick C. Smith Deputy Senior Advisor for the Office of Security Affairs
- Christopher Segar Representative of the United Kingdom Government
- Heidi Venamore Representative of the Australian Government
- Maj Todd Gondeck Coalition Joint Task Force – 7, Comptroller
- Rodney Bent Chairman/Director Office of Management and Budget

== Minutes ==
None of the minutes is complete. Many are missing.

In some cases the minutes did not include an attendance list. When an attendance list was present, the roles and titles of the attendees was not always provided.

Only rarely did the minutes record whether the attendees had reviewed and approved the minutes of the previous meeting, or the date of the next meeting.

The minutes seldom recorded the wording of motions, who seconded them, who voted for them or against them, or even the vote tally.

In some cases where an attendance list was part of the minutes, decisions were made when the board did not have quorum.

The KPMG audit of the Development Fund for Iraq notes that of the minutes of the 43 Program Review Board meetings it was able to review, all from 2003, just two were attended by the Iraqi member. The list of minutes available on the board's Web site lists 34 meetings in that year.

- June 7, 2003 (.pdf)
- June 8, 2003 (.pdf) Additional notes to the meeting of June 6 [sic].
- June 21, 2003 (.pdf)
- June 25, 2003 (.pdf)
- July 5, 2003 (.pdf)
- July 8, 2003 (.pdf)
- July 12, 2003 (.pdf)
- July 15, 2003 (.pdf)
- July 27, 2003 (.pdf)
- July 29, 2003 (.pdf)
- August 12, 2003
- September 1, 2003
- September 2, 2003
- September 7, 2003 (.pdf)
- September 9, 2003 (.pdf)
- September 13, 2003 (.pdf)
- October 7, 2003 (.doc)
- October 8, 2003
- October 11, 2003
- October 18, 2003
- October 21, 2003
- October 25, 2003
- October 28, 2003
- November 1, 2003
- November 8, 2003
- November 11, 2003
- November 15, 2003
- November 22, 2003
- November 29, 2003
- December 2, 2003
- December 6, 2003
- December 14, 2003
- December 20, 2003
- December 29, 2003
- January 3, 2004
- January 10, 2004
- January 17, 2004
- January 24, 2004
- January 31, 2004
- February 8, 2004
- February 15, 2004
- February 24, 2004
- March 6, 2004
- March 10, 2004
- March 29, 2004
- April 7, 2004
- April 14, 2004
- April 28, 2004
- May 12, 2004
- May 15, 2004
- June 2, 2004
