= Development Fund for Iraq =

U.S. development fund post invasion of Iraq

In May 2003, following the invasion of Iraq in March of that year, the Central Bank of Iraq-Development Fund for Iraq (DFI) account was created at the U.S. Federal Reserve Bank of New York at the request of the Coalition Provisional Authority (CPA) Administrator. A part of the fund has been transferred to Baghdad and Iraq, and the DFI-Baghdad account was opened at the Central Bank of Iraq "for cash payment requirements". The fund also eventually received money (US$1.724 billion) from seized and "vested" Iraqi bank accounts and funds seized by coalition forces ($926.7 million). $650 million of this amount belongs to Uday Saddam Hussein, the older son of the former Iraqi president. (This money was also used during the transition period before the DFI was set up.) The DFI have been disbursed mainly for "the wheat purchase program, the currency exchange program, the electricity and oil infrastructure programs, equipment for Iraqis security forces, and for Iraqi civil service salaries and ministry budget operations".

The DFI was put under the control of the Coalition Provisional Authority and the administrative arm of the US-UK occupation forces. International Advisory and Monitoring Board (IAMB) was created in United Nations Security Council Resolution 1483 (2003). IAMB is an independent oversight body for DFI and its principal role is to ensure transparency and financial accountability of the DFI. The IAMB was operated from the establishment of the DFI on May 22, 2003, until the dissolution of the CPA on June 28, 2004.

In October 2004, the audits conducted by IAMB and KPMG revealed the CPA's inadequate accounting system. IAMB failed its oversight process for several months because of procedural disputes and US manipulation. During this time illegal export of petroleum was conducted secretly from Iraq, and a large amount of funds for DFI were disbursed without accountability. According to the audits conducted by the Special Inspector General for Iraq Reconstruction (SIGIR), US$8.8 billion of the US$23 billion of Iraqi money disbursed for DFI has not been accounted the use.

After June 28, 2004, the Iraqi Interim Government had administered the DFI under the IAMB's oversight following to United Nations Security Council Resolution 1546 until December 31, 2006.

Paul Bremer led the Coalition Provisional Authority. During his administration Ambassador Bremer was criticized by some for spending down over 90% of the Development Funds for Iraq. Less than 5% of the $18 billion Congress had set aside for reconstruction were spent during that period. These funds make up the Iraq Relief and Reconstruction Fund, which is largely managed by the Iraq Reconstruction Management Office. USAID also plays a role in managing these funds. Since the transfer of sovereignty in June 2004, the Development Fund for Iraq has been managed by the Iraqi Transitional Government.

== Audits ==
There have been several audits of the disbursement from the DFI during the CPA's stewardship. The first was performed by international accounting firm KPMG. United States Congressman Henry Waxman had the staff of the Committee on Government Reform to perform another audit of DFI's expenditures.

=== KPMG audit ===
International auditors KPMG were chosen by the Coalition Provisional Authority and the International Advisory and Monitoring Board to perform external audits of the Coalition's expenditures from the humanitarian Development Fund for Iraq. The IAMB started negotiating with the CPA to appoint an external auditor in December 2003. KPMG was appointed in April 2004, to audit the CPA's expenditures from Iraq's oil revenue in 2003. On July 15, 2004, KPMG released audit documents that highlighted several dozen serious accounting discrepancies. Note particularly the appendix devoted to Matters noted involving internal controls and other operational issues during the audit period of the Fund For the period to 31 December, 2003

United Nations Resolution 1483 transferred the authority to authorize expenditures from Iraq's oil revenue from the United Nations to the Coalition Provisional Authority.

It also created an international body to monitor the Coalition's expenditures from Iraq's oil revenue, the IAMB. The Coalition's authority to expend Iraq's oil revenue was conditional. The Coalition was only authorized to expend those funds for the benefit of the Iraqi people. Those expenditures were only authorized if they were made in an open and transparent manner. The Coalition was only authorized to expend funds so long as they cooperated in the IAMB's oversight of those expenditures. The Coalition was charged with the obligation to make those expenditures with meaningful Iraqi input.

Paragraphs 12 and 20 of UN resolution 1483 specified that an external auditor would be appointed to audit the expenditure made from Iraq's oil revenue.

The auditors identified dozens of serious ways in which the CPA failed to meet its obligations:

- Lack of cooperation with the auditors. CPA administrator Paul Bremer has complained that the independent Inspector General Stuart Bowen, whom the Congress appointed, never met with him. In contrast the KPMG auditors say Mr Bremer never scheduled a meeting with them, prior to the official hand-over, and surprised everyone by leaving Iraq early immediately after his early handover of authority to the Interim government. George Wolfe, the chairman of the Program Review Board, Iraq's de facto Treasurer "was unable to acknowledge the fair presentation of the statement of cash receipts and payments, the completeness of significant contracts entered into by the DFI and responsibilities for the implementation and operations of accounting and internal control systems, designed to prevent and detect fraud and error."
- Internal auditor. In the CPA Administrator's second regulation, of 10 June 2003, Bremer committed the CPA to "obtain the services of an independent certified public accounting firm to support the objective of ensuring that the Fund is administered and used in a transparent manner for the benefit of the people of Iraq, and is operated consistent with Resolution 1483. The accountants performing this function shall be separate from those public accountants (auditors) approved by the International Advisory and Monitoring Board." But Bremer never obtained the services of an internal auditor. Instead the CPA hired a consulting firm, to set up a bookkeeping system – incomplete at the time of the handover.
- Double entry bookkeeping. The CPA did not use a double-entry bookkeeping system. Instead, it used what that auditors called a single entry, cash-based, transaction list—$20 billion of petty cash. The CPA did not do a cash-reconciliation until April 2004, eleven months into its administration. At that point, the CPA had disbursed $6 billion in $100 bills.
- Metering Iraq's oil. Iraq's oil infrastructure was damaged when the CPA took over. The CPA effected selected repairs. But the IAMB found that the CPA had chosen not to repair the meters on the pipelines. The IAMB told the CPA that they were concerned that the lack of metering made auditing Iraq's oil exports unreliable – making it impossible to detect fraud, deception or smuggling. The minutes of the IAMB meeting make clear that the CPA had assured the IAMB that they were in the process of repairing the meters – in bad faith. The CPA's authority came to an end with the meters unrepaired. Estimates of how much oil revenue was siphoned off during the year of the CPA's administration go as high as $4 billion – comparable to the amount Saddam Hussein is suspected of stealing during the entire duration of the oil-for-food program.
- Record-keeping. The auditors found that the Program Review Board failed to keep proper minutes:
  - The PRB minutes did not always keep minutes of its meetings.
  - The PRB minutes almost never recorded the wording of minutes, or the vote tallies.
  - The auditors felt that the minutes did not record enough details for later readers to understand the reasons why the Board made their decisions.
  - The PRB minutes sometimes did not even record the who attended the meetings.
  - The auditors found that CPA staff responsible for overseeing programs were often unable to find their program files. They could not be counted on to be familiar with the programs they were responsible for.

=== Waxman audit ===
On June 20, 2005, the staff on Congressman Waxman's Committee on Government Reform released a highly critical report.

In their International Advisory and Monitoring Board's press release of June 22, 2004 states:

"The IAMB was also informed by the CPA that contrary to earlier representations the award of metering contracts have been delayed and continues to urge the expeditious resolution of this critical issue."

The CPA was shipping Iraqi oil through a pipeline system with non-functioning meters. The actual amount of oil being shipped would have had to be estimated. The Iraqi people were left in the position where they had to trust that the CPA's estimates were honest.

== Criticism ==
=== Lack of transparency ===
The Development Fund for Iraq receives 95 percent of the government proceeds from Iraqi oil sales. The 2003 budget also noted that the Development Fund will provide $1.2 billion for the budget. However, the relationship between the DFI and the budget has not been made clear—the budget anticipated oil revenues of $3.4 billion—much greater than the amount in the DFI then. Moreover, only the Provisional Authority Administrator could authorise spending from the DFI. Little information has been made public about the DFI. The Coalition Provisional Authority excluded information on its web site about any transfer of assets into and out of the DFI.

== See also ==
- International Advisory and Monitoring Board
- Dover test
- Special Inspector General for Iraq Reconstruction
