= United Nations Security Council Resolution 1483 =

UN Security Council Resolution 1483
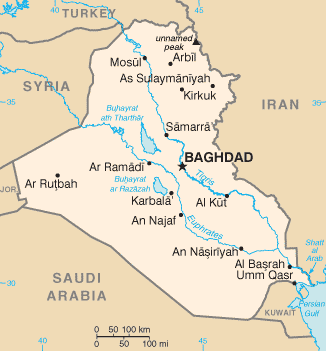
- Iraq
- Date: 22 May 2003
- Meeting no.: 4,761
- Code: S/RES/1483 (Document)
- Subject: The situation between Iraq and Kuwait
- Voting summary: 14 voted for; None voted against; 1 abstained
- Result: Adopted

Security Council composition
- Permanent members: China; France; Russia; United Kingdom; United States
- Non-permanent members: Angola; Bulgaria; Chile; Cameroon; Germany; Guinea; Mexico; Pakistan; Spain; Syria

United Nations Security Council resolution 1483, adopted on 22 May 2003, after recalling all previous resolutions on the situation between Iraq and Kuwait, the Council lifted trade sanctions against Iraq (excluding an arms embargo) and terminated the Oil-for-Food Programme.

The resolution was drafted by the United States and co-sponsored by Spain and the United Kingdom; it was approved by 14 of 15 Security Council members as Syria did not participate in the voting.

== Resolution ==
=== Observations ===
The Security Council reaffirmed the importance of the disarmament of Iraqi weapons of mass destruction and the right of the Iraqi people to determine their own political future and control of their natural resources. It encouraged efforts to form a representative government to afford equal rights and justice to all Iraqi citizens, and recalled Resolution 1325 (2000) on women to that effect.

Furthermore, the Council determined that the United Nations should play a vital role in humanitarian relief and reconstruction efforts and the development of institutions in Iraq. It welcomed the resumption of humanitarian efforts and the appointment of a Special Adviser by the Secretary-General Kofi Annan. Meanwhile, the preamble of the resolution affirmed the need for accountability for the crimes committed by the previous Iraqi regime under Saddam Hussein and respect for Iraqi heritage.

The Council recognised the responsibilities and obligations of the United Kingdom and United States as occupying powers and of other states that were not occupying powers as working under their command. It welcomed the commitment of Member States towards the stability of Iraq, remained concerned about the fate of Kuwaiti and third-state nationals unaccounted for since 2 August 1990 (the day Iraq invaded Kuwait) and determined that the situation in Iraq remained a threat to international peace and security.

=== Acts ===
The resolution, adopted under Chapter VII of the United Nations Charter, resolved many of the legal and governmental ambiguities that resulted from the 2003 invasion of Iraq by the U.S. and U.K.-led "coalition of the willing". Its three most important features are that it recognized the US-UK coalition's responsibilities under applicable international law as occupying powers; recognised the creation of a transitional governing council of Iraqis; and removed all sanctions against Iraq that were placed upon the former regime of Saddam Hussein under resolutions 661 (1991), 778 (1992) and others. Additionally, it terminated the Oil-for-Food Programme.

The resolution transferred the authority to authorize expenditures from Iraq's oil revenue from the United Nations to a Development Fund for Iraq, controlled by the Coalition Provisional Authority, on 23 May 2003. It also created an international body to monitor the Coalition's expenditures from Iraq's oil revenue, the International Advisory and Monitoring Board (IAMB). The Coalition's authority to expend Iraq's oil revenue was conditional. The Coalition was only authorized to expend those funds for the benefit of the Iraqi people. Those expenditures were only authorized if they were made in an open and transparent manner. The Coalition was only authorized to expend funds so long as they cooperated in the IAMB's oversight of those expenditures, and the Coalition was charged with the obligation to make those expenditures with meaningful Iraqi input.

The Oil-for-Food Program's remaining funds of $10 billion were transferred over a 6-month winding-up period to the Development Fund for Iraq, representing 14% of the program's total income over 5 years.

The Coalition was widely criticized for failing to implement adequate financial controls; with failing to make expenditures from the Development Fund for Iraq in an open and transparent manner.

== See also ==
- Coalition Provisional Authority Program Review Board
- Foreign relations of Iraq
- Gulf War
- International Advisory and Monitoring Board
- Iraq disarmament crisis
- Iraq disarmament timeline 1990–2003
- List of United Nations Security Council Resolutions 1401 to 1500 (2002–2003)
