= United Nations resolution =

Formal text adopted by a United Nations body

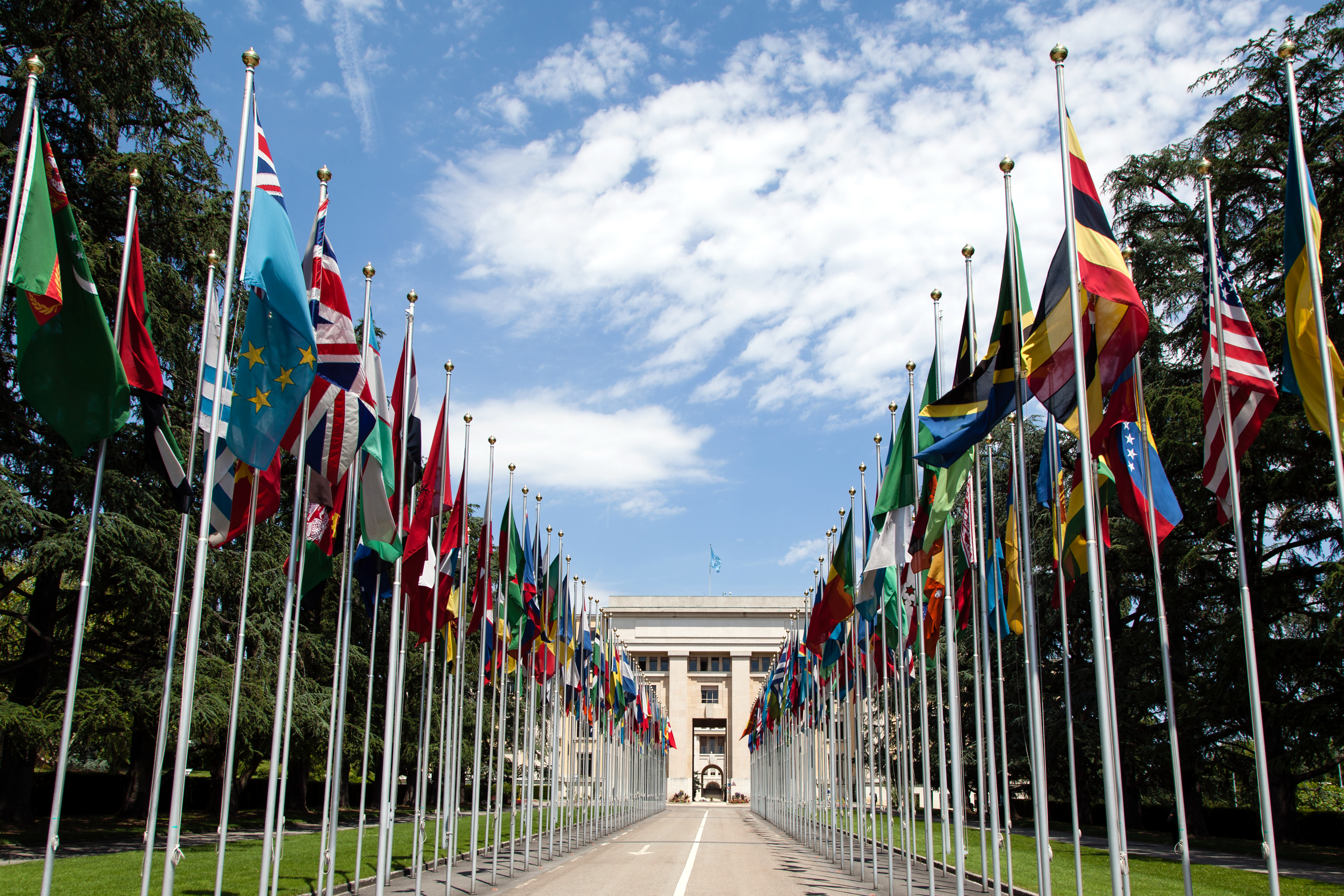
The United Nations Office at Geneva (Switzerland) is the second largest UN office, after the United Nations Headquarters in New York City.

A United Nations resolution (UN resolution) is a formal text adopted by a United Nations (UN) body. Although any UN body can issue resolutions, in practice most resolutions are issued by the Security Council or the General Assembly, in the form of United Nations Security Council resolutions and United Nations General Assembly resolutions, respectively.

== Legal status ==
=== General Assembly resolutions ===
Except concerning UN budgetary matters and instructions to lower UN bodies, General Assembly resolutions are non-binding. The UN's website describes General Assembly resolutions as the expression of member states' views, and as not legally binding upon member states.

Articles 10 and 14 of the UN Charter refer to General Assembly resolutions as "recommendations"; the recommendatory nature of General Assembly resolutions has repeatedly been stressed by the International Court of Justice.

=== Security Council resolutions ===
Under Article 25 of the Charter, UN member states are bound to carry out "decisions of the Security Council in accordance with the present Charter".

In 1971, the International Court of Justice (ICJ) – also called the "World Court", the highest court dealing with international law – asserted in an advisory opinion on the question of Namibia that all UN Security Council resolutions are legally binding. Some voices, however, defend that a difference should be made between United Nations Security Council resolutions adopted under "Chapter VII" of the UN Charter, which are legally binding, and those adopted under "Chapter VI" of the UN Charter, which are non binding; in practice, however, United Nations Security Council resolutions seldom explicit whether they are being adopted based on Chapter VI or VII of the UN Charter.

The Repertory of Practice of United Nations Organs, a UN legal publication, says that during the United Nations Conference on International Organization which met in San Francisco in 1945, attempts to limit obligations of Members under Article 25 of the Charter to those decisions taken by the Council in the exercise of its specific powers under Chapters VI, VII and VIII of the Charter failed. It was stated at the time that those obligations also flowed from the authority conferred on the Council under Article 24(1) to act on the behalf of the members while exercising its responsibility for the maintenance of international peace and security. Article 24, interpreted in this sense, becomes a source of authority which can be drawn upon to meet situations which are not covered by the more detailed provisions in the succeeding articles. The Repertory on Article 24 says: "The question whether Article 24 confers general powers on the Security Council ceased to be a subject of discussion following the advisory opinion of the International Court of Justice rendered on 21 June 1971 in connection with the question of Namibia (ICJ Reports, 1971, page 16)".

For more information on specific resolutions, see United Nations Security Council resolution.

== Structure of a resolution ==
United Nations resolutions follow a common format. Each resolution has three parts: the heading, the preambular clauses, and the operative clauses. The entire resolution consists of one long sentence, with commas and semi-colons throughout, and only one period at the very end. The heading contains the name of the body issuing the resolution (be it the Security Council, the General Assembly, a subsidiary organ of the GA, or any other resolution-issuing organization), which serves as the subject of the sentence; the preambular clauses (also called preambular phrases) indicating the framework through which the problem is viewed, as a preamble does in other documents; and the operative clauses (also called operative phrases) in which the body delineates the course of action it will take through a logical progression of sequentially numbered operative clauses (if it is the Security Council or a UN organ making policy for within the UN) or recommends to be taken (in many Security Council resolutions and for all other bodies when acting outside the UN). Each operative clause calls for a specific action.

The last operative clause, at least in the Security Council, is almost always "Decides [or Resolves] to remain seized of the matter," (sometimes changed to "actively seized"). The reasoning behind this custom is somewhat murky, but it appears to be an assurance that the body in question will consider the topic addressed in the resolution in the future if it is necessary. In the case of Security Council resolutions, it may well be employed with the hope of prohibiting the UNGA from calling an 'emergency special session' on any unresolved matters, under the terms of the 'Uniting for Peace resolution', owing to the Charter stipulation in Article 12 that: "While the Security Council is exercising in respect of any dispute or situation the functions assigned to it in the present Charter, the General Assembly shall not make any recommendation with regard to that dispute or situation."

The preambular and operative clauses almost always start with verbs, sometimes modified by adverbs then continue with whatever the body decides to put in; the first word is always either italicized or underlined. However, preambular clauses are unnumbered, end with commas, and sometimes do begin with adjectives; operative clauses are numbered, end with semicolons (except for the final one, which ends with a full stop/period), and never begin with adjectives.

The name of the issuing body may be moved from above the preambular clauses to below them; the decision to do so is mostly stylistic, and the resolution still comprises a coherent sentence.

== Types ==
United Nations resolutions can be both substantive resolutions and procedural resolutions.

In addition, resolutions can be classified by the organ in which they originate, e.g.:

- United Nations General Assembly resolutions
- United Nations Security Council resolutions

== Uniting for Peace ==
As a way to address deadlock in the Security Council caused by the veto of one or more of the permanent five (P5) members of the Security Council, the General Assembly passed Resolution 377, the "Uniting for Peace" resolution at the urging of the United States. UNGA Resolution 377 states that when the Security Council, because of a lack of unanimity among its P5 members, fails to act as required to maintain international peace and security, the General Assembly shall consider the matter immediately and may issue appropriate recommendations to UN members for collective measures, including the use of armed force when necessary, in order to maintain or to restore international peace and security. Envisioning the need for prompt action, Resolution 377 also created the "Emergency Special Session" (ESS) mechanism. The Uniting for Peace approach to quashing international conflicts and crises has been used by the General Assembly several times, including to address conflict in Korea in 1951, in the Middle East in 1956, and more recently in Ukraine (since 2022).

== Implementation ==
Enforcement of resolutions depends on the more powerful member states of the UN and for this reason many resolutions, including scores of Security Council resolutions, have remained unimplemented. Resolutions against allies of the United States constitute by far the largest portion of unimplemented UN resolutions, according to a review of many decades of the diplomatic record by international relations scholar Stephen Zunes. US ally Israel and NATO member Turkey each stand in violation of well over a dozen UN Security Council resolutions.
