= Stuart Bowen =

American lawyer (born 1958)

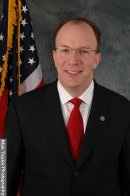

Special Inspector General for Iraq Reconstruction
- In office January 20, 2004 – 13 October 2013
- President: George W. Bush; Barack Obama
- Preceded by: Position established
- Succeeded by: Position abolished

Personal details
- Born: March 24, 1958 (age 67) Washington, D.C., U.S.
- Education: University of the South (BA); Vanderbilt University; St. Mary's University, Texas (JD)

Stuart W. Bowen Jr. (born March 24, 1958), is an American lawyer who served as the Special Inspector General for Iraq Reconstruction (SIGIR) from January 20 2004 to October 2013 under President Bush and President Obama.

== Background ==
Stuart Bowen was born in Washington, D.C., on March 24, 1958. Bowen attended the Episcopal High School in Alexandria, Virginia, earned a B.A. from the University of the South/Swanee, attended Vanderbilt University Law School, and received a J.D. from St. Mary's University School of Law in San Antonio, where he served on the Law Journal's Editorial Board. He spent four years on active duty as an intelligence officer in the U.S. Air Force, earning the rank of Captain and the Air Force Commendation Medal. From 1991 to 1992, Bowen was Briefing Attorney to Texas Supreme Court Justice Raul Gonzalez; and from 1992 to 1994, he was an Assistant Attorney General of Texas, with a litigation practice focused on the civil prosecution of state licensee regulatory violations and appellate work in state and federal court.

From 1994 to 2000, Bowen held a variety of positions on Texas Governor George W. Bush's staff, including Deputy General Counsel, Deputy General Counsel for Litigation, and Assistant General Counsel. He was a member of President Bush's legal team which handled the post-election litigation in Florida during November–December 2000. Bowen subsequently served as counsel to the Bush-Cheney transition team.

From 2001 to 2003, Bowen served President Bush as Deputy Assistant to the President, and Deputy Staff Secretary, and Special Assistant to the President and Associate Counsel. In 2003, he became a partner at the law firm of Patton Boggs LLP, working out of its Washington, D.C. office.

== Special Inspector General for Iraq Reconstruction ==
As Special Inspector General for Iraq Reconstruction, Bowen was tasked with ensuring effective oversight of the $63 billion appropriated for Iraq's relief and reconstruction.

Bowen has supervised the production of 35 quarterly reports to Congress, traveled to Iraq 34 times, and testified before Congress on 35 occasions. He managed the compilation of seven lessons learned reports, including Hard Lessons (Government Printing Office February 2009), a book-length report on the entire Iraq reconstruction enterprise, which provides 13 recommendations for improving the US approach to overseas stabilization and reconstruction operations.

== Texas Health and Human Services Commission Inspector General ==
In January 2015, Texas Governor Greg Abbott named Bowen as the inspector general for the Texas Health and Human Services Commission.

Appointed as Inspector General in the aftermath of a contracting scandal, Bowen was tasked with restoring public trust and addressing operational challenges within the Texas Health and Human Services System. Bowen was also responsible for improving relationships with the Medicaid provider community and the Texas Health and Human Services Commission (HHSC). In addition, Bowen faced repairing ties with the Medicaid provider community and with HHSC. As Inspector General, Bowen's role involved preventing, detecting, and deterring fraud, waste, and abuse within the Texas Health and Human Services System.

On October 22, 2015, Bowen accused Planned Parenthood of misconduct and informed them all of the state's Planned Parenthood affiliates were being dropped as a Medicaid health care provider. He cited videos showing misconduct and sent investigators with letters to Planned Parenthood offices in San Antonio, Dallas, and the Houston area, requesting records. His letters cited the authority of Health and Human Services Commission to investigate allegations of potential fraud involving Medicaid payments.

Bowen was forced to resign by Governor Greg Abbott on May 10, 2017, after the governor discovered Bowen had been moonlighting for Hyatt Farber Schreck, a lobbying firm that represents the Iraqi government. Bowen said he had consulted with a state ethics advisor and was told that his moonlighting "fully complied" with the health commission's policy. However, the health agency's policies explicitly bar employees from having an "economic or monetary interest in a lobbying firm".
