= Special Inspector General for Iraq Reconstruction =

Independent Iraqi government agency

The Office of the Special Inspector General for Iraq Reconstruction (SIGIR) (October 2004–October 2013) was a United States government agency created as the successor to the Coalition Provisional Authority Office of Inspector General (CPA-IG). SIGIR was an independent government agency created by the Congress to provide oversight of the use (or misuse) of the $52 billion U.S. reconstruction program in Iraq. Stuart W. Bowen Jr. was appointed to the position of CPA-IG on January 20, 2004 and served until its closure in October 2013. SIGIR reported directly to Congress, the secretary of state, and the secretary of defense.

SIGIR's mission was to provide independent and objective oversight of U.S.-funded Iraq reconstruction policies, programs, and operations through comprehensive audits, inspections, and investigations. As of July 2009, SIGIR had issued twenty-two quarterly reports to Congress, 303 audits and inspections, 386 recommendations, and four "lessons learned" reports. SIGIR representatives have also testified before Congress on twenty-seven occasions.

In February 2009, SIGIR issued its fourth lessons learned report, Hard Lessons: The Iraq Reconstruction Experience. Hard Lessons provides the first comprehensive account of the U.S. reconstruction effort in Iraq, chronicling the myriad challenges that confronted the rebuilding program, and concludes with thirteen lessons drawn from the reconstruction experience.

== Influence on law and policy ==
SIGIR reports have led to several important changes in U.S. reconstruction policy. These changes to the law and to key agencies’ policies and procedures have increased management efficiencies and influenced the development of more effective approaches to overseas contingency operations.

Some examples of how SIGIR's oversight work has affected U.S. policy include: (1) the reorganization of the Department of State's anti-corruption programs in Iraq; (2) the imposition by Congress of stricter limitations on the amount of Commander's Emergency Response Program funds that can be used on any one project; (3) the establishment of improved processes for transferring U.S.-funded assets to the government of Iraq; (4) the issuance by the Office of Management and Budget of updated procurement guidance, including a number of management and operational best practices that should be considered in planning contingency operations and responding to national emergencies; and (5) the establishment by the Congress of two new special inspectors general modeled on SIGIR – SIGAR, to oversee U.S.-funded reconstruction efforts in Afghanistan, and SIGTARP, to oversee the Department of Treasury's $700 billion Troubled Asset Relief Program (TARP). SIGIR has provided resources and expertise to both SIGAR and SIGTARP during their establishment and development.

== Recognition ==
SIGIR's work has been recognized in three awards from the President's Council on Integrity and Efficiency. SIGIR's findings and analyses have also contributed to key policy papers produced by Congressional Committees, think tanks, and policy review bodies, such as the Gansler Commission, the Commission on Wartime Contracting in Iraq and Afghanistan, and the Iraq Study Group.

While an Army War College fellow at The Institute of World Politics, Brigadier General (Army) Brian Mennes criticized UC national security by pointing at the failures of the SIGIR in his paper "Security Reform beyond the Project on National Security Reform."
