= United Nations Security Council Resolution 1923 =

United Nations Security Council resolution

UN Security Council Resolution 1923
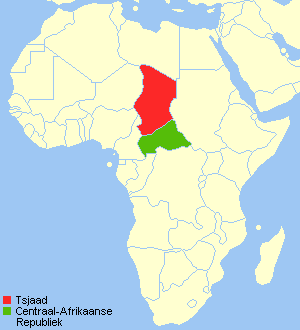
- Chad (red) and the Central African Republic (green)
- Date: 25 May 2010
- Meeting no.: 6,321
- Code: S/RES/1923 (2010) (Document)
- Subject: The situation in Chad, the Central African Republic and the subregion
- Voting summary: 15 voted for; None voted against; None abstained
- Result: Adopted

Security Council composition
- Permanent members: China; France; Russia; United Kingdom; United States
- Non-permanent members: Austria; Bosnia–Herzegovina; Brazil; Gabon; Japan; Lebanon; Mexico; Nigeria; Turkey; Uganda

United Nations Security Council Resolution 1923 was adopted unanimously on 25 May 2010, after recalling resolutions 1769 (2007), 1778 (2007), 1834 (2008), 1861 (2009), 1913 (2010) and 1922 (2010). The Council extended the mandate of the United Nations Mission in the Central African Republic and Chad (MINURCAT) for a final time until 31 December 2010, with a complete withdrawal by that date.

The withdrawal of MINURCAT came after Chad had asked for it to leave, calling the force a "failure" and declaring it would take over security operations in the region. Amnesty International and the United Nations High Commissioner for Refugees warned that the withdrawal would endanger thousands of refugees.

== Resolution ==
=== Observations ===
In the preamble of the resolution, the Council expressed concern at the consequences of the War in Darfur in eastern Chad and the northeastern Central African Republic, including armed activities and banditry which resulted in violations of human rights and international humanitarian law. It welcomed the deployment by both Chad and Sudan of a joint border force but stressed that a proper settlement of the Darfur issue through implementation of all relevant agreements would contribute to long-term peace and stability. It also emphasised the need of durable solutions for refugees and displaced persons, noting the Convention Relating to the Status of Refugees in this regard.

The resolution also called for the respect of international refugee law, the preservation of the humanitarian nature of refugee camps and prevention of recruitment of women and children, and recalled several previous resolutions to that effect. It noted requests from the Government of Chad for MINURCAT to withdraw and of the need for the orderly reduction of the operation.

=== Acts ===
The Security Council, extending MINURSO's mandate for a final time, noted that Chad would be responsible for the protection of the civilian population in eastern Chad, including humanitarian and United Nations personnel. Furthermore, it called upon Chad to take action in this regard, for example by the demilitarisation of refugee camps. The Council requested both Chad and the United Nations to assess the situation on the ground on a monthly basis.

The Council decided to reduce the military component of MINURCAT to 2,200 (1,900 in Chad and 300 in the Central African Republic) with 25 military observers and a maximum of 300 police officers. The Secretary-General Ban Ki-moon was called upon to implement the first withdrawal of the exceeding number of troops by 15 July 2010 and the remaining troops beginning 15 October 2010 and ending by 31 December 2010.

For the remainder of its mandate, MINURCAT could continue to assist with the organisation and training of Chad’s Détachement Intégré de Sécurité (DIS), to assist in efforts to relocate refugee camps away from the border; to liaise with other security structures in both Chad and the Central African Republic; and to contribute to the protection of civil rights and the rule of law. Until 15 October 2010, MINURCAT was to provide security to United Nations personnel or humanitarian workers and respond to threats, while all parties had to guarantee its freedom of movement to allow it to carry out its mandate.

The resolution welcomed the normalisation of diplomatic relations between Chad and Sudan. At the same time it called on governments in the region to prohibit their territory from being used by armed groups to attack other countries.

Finally, the Secretary-General was requested to provide regular reports to the Council by 31 July 15 October and 15 December 2010 on the security and humanitarian situation in the region. In his July report, the Secretary-General was to provide international and regional options for the Central African Republic after MINURCAT's departure, and in his December report to assess the lessons learned in the context of MINURCAT.

== See also ==
- African Union – United Nations Hybrid Operation in Darfur
- Central African Republic Bush War
- Chadian Civil War (2005–2010)
- List of United Nations Security Council Resolutions 1901 to 2000 (2009–2011)
- United Nations Mission in Sudan
- War in Darfur
