= United Nations Security Council Resolution 1959 =

UN Security Council Resolution 1959
- Flag of Burundi
- Date: 16 December 2010
- Meeting no.: 6,451
- Code: S/RES/1902 (Document)
- Subject: The situation in Burundi
- Voting summary: 15 voted for; None voted against; None abstained
- Result: Adopted

Security Council composition
- Permanent members: China; France; Russia; United Kingdom; United States
- Non-permanent members: Austria; Bosnia–Herzegovina; Brazil; Gabon; Japan; Lebanon; Mexico; Nigeria; Turkey; Uganda

United Nations Security Council Resolution 1959, adopted unanimously on December 16, 2010, after recalling resolutions 1719 (2006), 1791 (2007), 1858 (2008) and 1902 (2009), the Council established the United Nations Office in Burundi (BNUB) to replace the United Nations Integrated Office in Burundi (BINUB) as part of a scaled-down United Nations presence in the country for an initial period of twelve months, beginning January 1, 2011.

== Resolution ==
=== Observations ===
In the preamble of the resolution, the Council recognised the successful holding of elections in Burundi between May and September 2010 and encouraged the government to create space for all political parties. It was further encouraged by the government's anti-corruption policy and progress towards peace and stability. The Council welcomed the engagement of the Peacebuilding Commission in Burundi, and the latter's commitment to regional integration within the Economic Community of the Great Lakes Countries and East African Community.

The resolution also expressed concern at human rights violations, including extrajudicial killings, torture and restrictions on civil liberties.

=== Acts ===
The Secretary-General Ban Ki-moon was asked to establish BNUB to support peace, stability and national reconciliation in Burundi. It would be headed by a Special Representative of the Secretary-General, and undertake the following tasks:

(a) support the development of national institutions;
(b) promoting dialogue;
(c) combating impunity;
(d) promoting human rights;
(e) ensuring economic and financial policies meet the needs of vulnerable people and advocate resource mobilisation for Burundi;
(f) support with regional integration issues.

The Council emphasised the primary responsibility of the Burundian government for peacebuilding and long-term development and encouraged more efforts to improve governance and tackle corruption. It was also important to address security sector reform and the reintegration of former child soldiers. Meanwhile, a tripartite agreement between Burundi, the Democratic Republic of the Congo and the United Nations High Commissioner for Refugees concerning refugees was welcomed.

== See also ==
- Burundi Civil War
- List of United Nations Security Council Resolutions 1901 to 2000 (2009–2011)
- Politics of Burundi
