= United Nations Security Council Resolution 2027 =

UN Security Council Resolution 2027
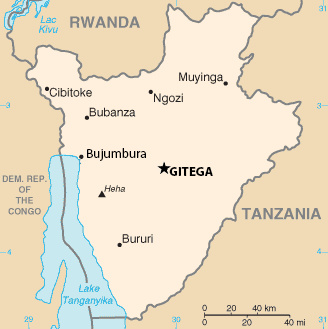
- Location of Burundi
- Date: 20 December 2011
- Meeting no.: 6,691
- Code: S/RES/2027 (Document)
- Subject: The situation in Burundi
- Voting summary: 15 voted for; None voted against; None abstained
- Result: Adopted

Security Council composition
- Permanent members: China; France; Russia; United Kingdom; United States
- Non-permanent members: Bosnia–Herzegovina; Brazil; Colombia; Germany; Gabon; India; Lebanon; Nigeria; Portugal; South Africa

United Nations Security Council Resolution 2027 was unanimously adopted on 20 December 2011, after recalling resolutions 1719 (2006), 1791 (2007), 1858 (2008) and 1902 (2009) and 1959 (2010). It mandated that the UNSC will "continue its support for the Government of Burundi in the areas of socio-economic development, reintegrating conflict-affected populations and deepening the country’s regional integration."

== See also ==
- List of United Nations Security Council Resolutions 2001 to 2100
