= United Nations Security Council Resolution 1922 =

UN Security Council Resolution 1922
- MINURCAT medal bar
- Date: 12 May 2010
- Meeting no.: 6,312
- Code: S/RES/1922 (Document)
- Subject: The situation in Chad, the Central African Republic and the subregion
- Voting summary: 15 voted for; None voted against; None abstained
- Result: Adopted

Security Council composition
- Permanent members: China; France; Russia; United Kingdom; United States
- Non-permanent members: Austria; Bosnia–Herzegovina; Brazil; Gabon; Japan; Lebanon; Mexico; Nigeria; Turkey; Uganda

United Nations Security Council Resolution 1922, adopted unanimously on May 12, 2010, after recalling resolutions 1769 (2007), 1778 (2007), 1834 (2008), 1861 (2009) and 1913 (2010), the Council noted that the situation in the region of Darfur in Sudan, Chad and the Central African Republic constituted a threat to international peace and security, and therefore extended the mandate of the United Nations Mission in the Central African Republic and Chad (MINURCAT) for a further two weeks until May 26, 2010, pending further discussions on its future.

Chad had requested that MINURCAT leave as it had not been fully deployed, did not protect civilians or build promised infrastructure projects; the Government of Chad would then assume primary responsibility for the protection of civilians. The Secretary-General Ban Ki-moon, in his report on the situation, suggested that the mandate of MINURCAT be extended for an additional year, noting the continued instability in the northeastern part of the Central African Republic bordering Chad and Sudan, and the need to protect refugees from the Darfur region of Sudan. In this manner, a phased withdrawal of the United Nations military component could then take place if the Council agreed to his proposals.

== See also ==
- African Union – United Nations Hybrid Operation in Darfur
- Central African Republic Bush War
- Chadian Civil War (2005–2010)
- List of United Nations Security Council Resolutions 1901 to 2000 (2009–2011)
- United Nations Mission in Sudan
