= Special Representative of the Secretary-General =

Of the United Nations

Emblem of the United Nations

A Special Representative of the Secretary-General is a senior official appointed by the secretary-general of the United Nations to represent them in a specific country, region, or thematic area. Special Representatives typically head United Nations peacekeeping operations, political missions, or specialized offices, and may conduct country visits, report on conditions on the ground, and act as negotiators on behalf of the United Nations.

== Current Special Representatives ==
Special Representatives as of September 2025 include:

Current Special Representatives
Name	Title	Date of appointment
Khassim Diagne	Special Representative and Head of the United Nations Peacekeeping Force in Cyprus (UNFICYP)	3 September 2025
Carlos Gabriel Ruiz-Massieu Aguirre	Special Representative of the Secretary-General for Haiti and Head of the United Nations Integrated Office in Haiti (BINUH)	2 July 2025
James C. Swan	Special Representative for Somalia and Head of the United Nations Transitional Assistance Mission in Somalia (UNTMIS)	28 March 2025
Hanna Tetteh	Special Representative for Libya and Head of the United Nations Support Mission in Libya	24 January 2025
Mohamed Al Hassan	Special Representative of the Secretary-General for Iraq and Head of UNAMI	10 October 2024
Kamal Kishore	Special Representative of the Secretary-General for Disaster Risk Reduction (UNDRR)	27 March 2024
Kaha Imnadze	Special Representative of the Secretary-General for Central Asia and Head of the United Nations Regional Centre for Preventive Diplomacy for Central Asia	14 June 2023
Leonardo Santos Simao	Special Representative of the Secretary-General for West Africa and the Sahel and Head of the United Nations Office for West Africa and the Sahel	2 May 2023
Georgette Gagnon	Special Representative for Afghanistan and Head of the United Nations Assistance Mission in Afghanistan (UNAMA)	6 September 2025
Valentine Rugwabiza	Special Representative of the Secretary-General for the Central African Republic and Head of the United Nations Multidimensional Integrated Stabilization Mission in the Central African Republic (MINUSCA)	23 February 2022
Parfait Onanga-Anyanga	Special Representative of the Secretary-General to the African Union and Head of the United Nations Office to the African Union	22 February 2022
Peter N. Due	Special Representative of the Secretary-General and Head of the United Nations Interim Administration Mission in Kosovo (UNMIK)	10 November 2025
Alexander Ivanko	Special Representative of the Secretary-General for Western Sahara and Head of the United Nations Mission for the Referendum in Western Sahara (MINURSO)	27 August 2021
El Ghassim Wane	Special Representative of the Secretary-General for Mali and Head of the United Nations Multidimensional Integrated Stabilization Mission in Mali	15 March 2021
Bintou Keita	Special Representative of the Secretary-General in the Democratic Republic of the Congo and Head of the United Nations Organization Stabilization Mission in the Democratic Republic of the Congo (MONUSCO)	14 January 2021
Damilola Ogunbiyi	Special Representative of the Secretary-General for Sustainable Energy for All (SEforALL)	October 2019
Helen La Lime	Special Representative of the Secretary-General for Haiti and Head of the United Nations Integrated Office in Haiti (BINUH)	14 October 2019
Najat Maalla M'jid	Special Representative of the Secretary-General on Violence Against Children (SRSG/VAC)	30 May 2019
Miroslav Jenča	Special Representative of the Secretary-General for Colombia and Head of the United Nations Verification Mission in Colombia	08 September 2025
Pramila Patten	Special Representative of the Secretary-General on Sexual Violence in Conflict (SRSG/SVC)	12 April 2017
Vanessa Frazier	Special Representative of the Secretary-General for Children and Armed Conflict (SRSG/CAAC)	3 October 2025
Anita Kiki Gbeho	Special Representative of the United Nations Secretary-General and Head of the United Nations Mission in South Sudan (UNMISS)	10 April 2026

=== Current Deputy Special Representatives ===
Deputy Special Representatives as of September 2025 include:

Current Deputy Special Representatives
Name	Title	Date of appointment
Ingeborg Ulrika Ulfsdotter Richardson	Deputy Special Representative of the United Nations Support Mission in Libya (UNSMIL) and Resident Coordinator in Libya	08 August 2025
Georgette Gagnon	Deputy Special Representative of the Secretary-General for Afghanistan with the United Nations Assistance Mission in Afghanistan (UNAMA)	03 September 2024
Milbert Dongjoon Shin	Deputy Special Representative of the United Nations Interim Administration Mission in Kosovo	24 July 2024
Barrie Freeman	Deputy Special Representative of the Secretary-General for West Africa and the Sahel	10 May 2024
Stephanie Koury	Deputy Special Representative for Political Affairs in the United Nations Support Mission in Libya (UNSMIL), Officer-in-Charge	1 March 2024
Indrika Ratwatte	Deputy Special Representative of the Secretary-General for Afghanistan with the United Nations Assistance Mission in Afghanistan (UNAMA) and Resident and Humanitarian Coordinator in Afghanistan	07 November 2023
Mohamed Ag Ayoya	Deputy Special Representative of the Secretary-General for the United Nations Multidimensional Integrated Stabilization Mission in the Central African Republic (MINUSCA), Resident and Humanitarian Coordinator for the Central African Republic	21 November 2022
Ulrika Richardson	Deputy Special Representative of the Secretary-General for the United Nations Integrated Office in Haiti (BINUH) and Resident and Humanitarian Coordinator in Haiti	12 May 2022
Raúl Rosende Rodriguez	Deputy Special Representative (DSRSG) and Deputy Head of the United Nations Verification Mission in Colombia	15 March 2022
Bruno Lemarquis	Deputy Special Representative of the Secretary-General in the United Nations Organization Stabilization Mission in the Democratic Republic of the Congo (MONUSCO) and Resident and Humanitarian Coordinator in the Democratic Republic of the Congo	18 January 2022
Ghulam Mohammad Isaczai	Deputy Special Representative of the Secretary-General for Iraq and in the United Nations Assistance Mission for Iraq (UNAMI) and Resident Coordinator and Humanitarian Coordinator for Iraq	19 July 2022
Guang Cong	Deputy Special Representative of the Secretary-General (Political) for South Sudan and Deputy Head of the United Nations Mission in South Sudan (UNMISS)	24 March 2020

== Former Special Representatives ==
Former Special Representatives include:

Former Special Representatives
Name	Title	Appointment period
Martti Ahtisaari	United Nations Commissioner for Namibia | Special Representative of the Secretary-General and Head of the United Nations Transition Assistance Group (UNTAG)	1 January 1977 - 1 April 1982 | April 1989 - March 1990
Jean Arnault	Special Representative of the Secretary-General for Guatemala and Head of the United Nations Verification Mission in Guatemala (MINUGUA) | Special Representative of the Secretary-General for Burundi and Head of the United Nations Office in Burundi (BNUB) | Special Representative of the Secretary General in Afghanistan and Head of the United Nations Assistance Mission in Afghanistan (UNAMA) | Deputy Special Representative | Special Representative of the Secretary-General for Georgia and Head of the United Nations Observer Mission in Georgia (UNOMIG) | Special Representative of the Secretary-General for Colombia and Head of the United Nations Verification Mission in Colombia	1997 - 2000 | 2000 - 2001 | 2004 - 2006 | 2002 - 2003 | 2006 - 2008 | July 2017 -December 2018
José Victor da Silva Ângelo	Special Representative of the Secretary-General and Head of the United Nations Mission in the Central African Republic and Chad	31 January 2008 - 31 December 2010
Louise Arbour	Special Representative of the Secretary-General for International Migration	9 March 2017 - 31 December 2018
Zainab Bangura	Special Representative of the Secretary-General on Sexual Violence in Conflict	22 June 2012 - 12 April 2017
Natalio Ecarma III	Special Representative of the Secretary-General for the United Nations Disengagement Observer Force in the Golan Heights	10 March 2010 - 13 August 2013
Yash Ghai	Special Representative of the Secretary-General for human rights in Cambodia	1 November 2005 - 2008
Julian Harston	Special Representative of the Secretary-General in Haiti | Special Representative of the Secretary-General for United Nations Mission for the Referendum in Western Sahara | Deputy Special Representative of the Secretary General for the United Nations Mission in Bosnia and Herzegovina (UNMIBH) | Special Representative of the Secretary-General and Director of the United Nations Office in Belgrade	1997–1999 | ? | 1999 -April 2001 | March -November 2009
Sukehiro Hasegawa	Special Representative of the Secretary-General for East Timor and Head of the United Nations Mission of Support to East Timor (UNMISET) and the United Nations Office in East Timor	21 May 2004 - September 2006
Hina Jilani	Special Representative of the Secretary-General for Human Rights Defenders	2000 - 2008
Joseph E. Johnson	Special Representative of the Secretary-General for the Conciliation Commission for Palestine	1961 - 1963
Michael Keating	Special Representative of the Secretary-General and Head of the United Nations Assistance Mission in Somalia (UNSOM)	23 November 2015 - 1 October 2018
Jacques Paul Klein	Special Representative of the Secretary General for the United Nations Mission in Bosnia and Herzegovina (UNMIBH) | Special Representative of the Secretary-General for United Nations Mission in Liberia	2001 - 2003 | 2003 - 2005
Bernard Kouchner	Special Representative of the Secretary-General for Kosovo	15 July 1999 - 12 January 2001
Deborah Lyons	Special Representative of the Secretary-General for Afghanistan and Head of the United Nations Assistance Mission in Afghanistan (UNAMA)	24 March 2020 - 16 June 2022
Ian Martin	Special Representative of the Secretary-General and Head of United Nations Mission in Nepal | Special Representative of the Secretary-General and Head of the United Nations Support Mission in Libya	2006 - 2009 | 11 September 2011 - 14 October 2012
Ad Melkert	Special Representative of the Secretary-General for the United Nations Assistance Mission for Iraq	7 July 2009 - 1 October 2011
David Nabarro	Special Representative of the Secretary-General on Food Security and Nutrition	2009 - 2017
Jan Pronk	Special Representative of the Secretary-General for the United Nations Mission in Sudan (UNMIS)	1 July 2004 - 10 December 2006
John Noel Reedman	Special Representative of the Secretary-General in Palestine	c. 1948
John Ruggie	Special Representative of the Secretary-General on human rights and transnational corporations and other business enterprises	2005 - 2011
William L. Swing	Special Representative of the Secretary-General for Western Sahara and Head of the United Nations Mission for the Referendum in Western Sahara (MINURSO) | Special Representative of the Secretary-General and Head of the United Nations Organization Stabilization Mission in the Democratic Republic of the Congo	2001 - 2003 | May 2003 -January 2008
Peter Sutherland	Special Representative of the Secretary-General for International Migration	12 January 2006 - 9 March 2017
James Swan	Special Representative of the Secretary-General for Somalia and Head of the United Nations Assistance Mission in Somalia (UNSOM)	30 May 2019 - 27 October 2022
Sérgio Vieira de Mello	Special Representative of the Secretary-General for Kosovo | Special Representative of the Secretary-General for East Timor | Special Representative of the Secretary-General for Iraq	13 June 1999 - 15 July 1999 | December 1999 - May 2002 | 2003 - 2004
Mohamed Sahnoun	Special Representative of the Secretary-General for Somalia and Head of the United Nations Operation in Somalia I (UNOSOM I)	April - November 1992
Abdallah Wafy	Deputy Special Representative of the Secretary-General for the Democratic Republic of the Congo and the United Nations Organization Stabilization Mission in the Democratic Republic of the Congo (MONUSCO)	2013 - 2015
Leila Zerrougui	Special Representative of the Secretary-General for the Democratic Republic of the Congo and the United Nations Organization Stabilization Mission in the Democratic Republic of the Congo (MONUSCO)	January 2018 - February 2021
Colin Stewart	Special Representative of the Secretary-General and Head of the United Nations Peacekeeping Force in Cyprus (UNFICYP) and Deputy to the Secretary-General’s Special Adviser on Cyprus	December 2021 - August 2025

== See also ==
- Special Representative of the Secretary-General for East Timor
- Special Representative of the Secretary-General for Kosovo
- Special Representative of the Secretary-General for Western Sahara
- High Representative for Bosnia and Herzegovina
- Special Envoy of the Secretary-General
