= United Nations Security Council Resolution 1902 =

UN Security Council Resolution 1902
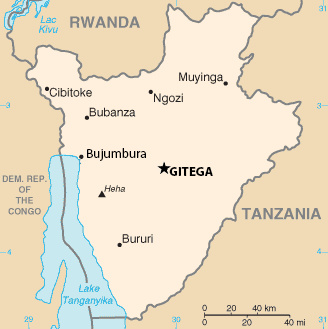
- Location of Burundi
- Date: 17 December 2009
- Meeting no.: 6,245
- Code: S/RES/1902 (Document)
- Subject: The situation in Burundi
- Voting summary: 15 voted for; None voted against; None abstained
- Result: Adopted

Security Council composition
- Permanent members: China; France; Russia; United Kingdom; United States
- Non-permanent members: Austria; Burkina Faso; Costa Rica; Croatia; Japan; Libya; Mexico; Turkey; Uganda; Vietnam

United Nations Security Council Resolution 1902, adopted unanimously on December 17, 2009, after emphasising the need for the international community to maintain peace and long-term development in Burundi, the Council extended the mandate of the United Nations Integrated Office in Burundi (BINUB), as established in resolutions 1719 (2006), 1791 (2007) and 1858 (2008), for another year, until 31 December 2010.

The Resolution urged the Government of Burundi to create an environment where free and fair presidential and legislative elections can take place in 2010. The Council also called on the Government of Burundi and the National Forces of Liberation to desist from any actions that may heighten tensions, emphasising the need to maintain dialogue. It further encouraged the Government to continue pursuing structural reforms in fighting corruption, and political and economic governance, while calling for respect and training on issues of human rights, which would include the establishment of an independent human rights commission.

== See also ==
- Burundi Civil War
- List of United Nations Security Council Resolutions 1901 to 2000 (2009–2011)
- Politics of Burundi
