= Joanna Wronecka =

Polish politician

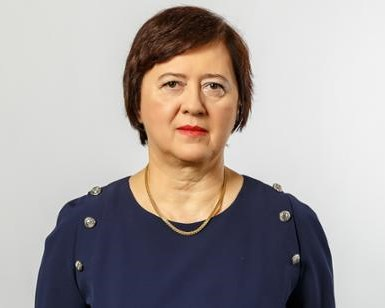

United Nations Special Coordinator for Lebanon
- In office 1 April 2021 – 20 May 2024
- Appointed by: António Guterres
- Preceded by: Ján Kubiš
- Succeeded by: Jeanine Hennis-Plasschaert

Poland Ambassador to the United Nations
- In office 2017–2021
- Appointed by: Andrzej Duda
- Secretary-General: António Guterres
- Preceded by: Bogusław Winid
- Succeeded by: Krzysztof Szczerski

Undersecretary of State in the Ministry of Foreign Affairs
- In office 2015–2017
- Appointed by: Beata Szydło

European Union Ambassador to Jordan
- In office 2010–2015
- Appointed by: Herman Van Rompuy and José Manuel Barroso
- Monarch: Abdullah II
- Succeeded by: Andrea Matteo Fontana

Poland Ambassador to Morocco
- In office 2005–2010
- Appointed by: Aleksander Kwaśniewski
- Monarch: Mohammed VI
- Preceded by: Mieczysław Stępiński
- Succeeded by: Witold Spirydowicz

Poland Ambassador to Egypt
- In office 1999–2003
- Appointed by: Aleksander Kwaśniewski
- President: Hosni Mubarak
- Preceded by: Grzegorz Dziemidowicz
- Succeeded by: Jan Natkański

Personal details
- Born: 30 March 1958 (age 68) Krotoszyn, Poland
- Education: University of Warsaw
- Profession: Diplomat

Joanna Wronecka (born 30 March 1958 in Krotoszyn) is a Polish diplomat who served as United Nations Special Coordinator for Lebanon from 2021 until 2024.

Wronecka served as Poland's ambassador to Egypt (1999–2003), Morocco (2005–2010), Permanent Representative to the United Nations (2017–2021), and as European Union Ambassador to Jordan (2011–2015).

== Early life and education ==
Wronecka graduated from Faculty of Arabic Studies of the University of Warsaw. She studied in Algeria, Egypt and France as well. In 1985 she defended her PhD thesis on Arab-Muslim philosophy. In 1980s she has been working at the Polish Academy of Sciences.

== Diplomatic career ==
In 1993 Wronecka joined the Polish diplomatic service, starting from the post of an expert. In 1996–1998 she was deputy director of the Department of the United Nations System and director of the Department of Africa and the Middle East (1998–1999) and Minister’s Secretariat (2003–2005). She served as Poland ambassador to Egypt (1999–2003), Morocco accredited to Mauritania and Senegal (2005–2010). From January 2011 to August 2015 she held the position of Head of the European Union Delegation to Jordan. On 26 November 2015 she was appointed Under Secretary of State in the Ministry of Foreign Affairs of Poland under minister Witold Waszczykowski, responsible for development aid as well as cooperation with African and Middle-East countries.

In November 2017 Wronecka became Permanent Representative of Poland to the United Nations. She ended her term on 31 May 2021.

In 2021, United Nations Secretary-General António Guterres appointed Wronecka as UN Envoy to Lebanon. She was succeeded by Jeanine Hennis-Plasschaert on 20 May 2024.

== Recognition ==
In 2010 Wronecka received the Knight's Cross of the Order of Polonia Restituta.

== Translations ==
- Abū Hāmid al-Ġazālï: Nisza świateł. Joanna Wronecka (tran.). Warszawa: Państwowe Wydawnictwo Naukowe, 1990, 2013, 82 pp. ISBN 83-01-09565-2.
- Ibn Arabi: Księga o podróży nocnej do najbardziej szlachetnego miejsca. Joanna Wronecka (tran.). Warszawa: Państwowe Wydawnictwo Naukowe, 1990, 2010, 132 pp. ISBN 83-01-09566-0.
- Ibn Arabi: Traktat o miłości. Joanna Wronecka (tran.). Warszawa: Państwowe Wydawnictwo Naukowe, 1995, 2010, 210 pp. ISBN 83-01-11844-X.
