= Jeanine Hennis-Plasschaert =

Dutch politician (born 1973)

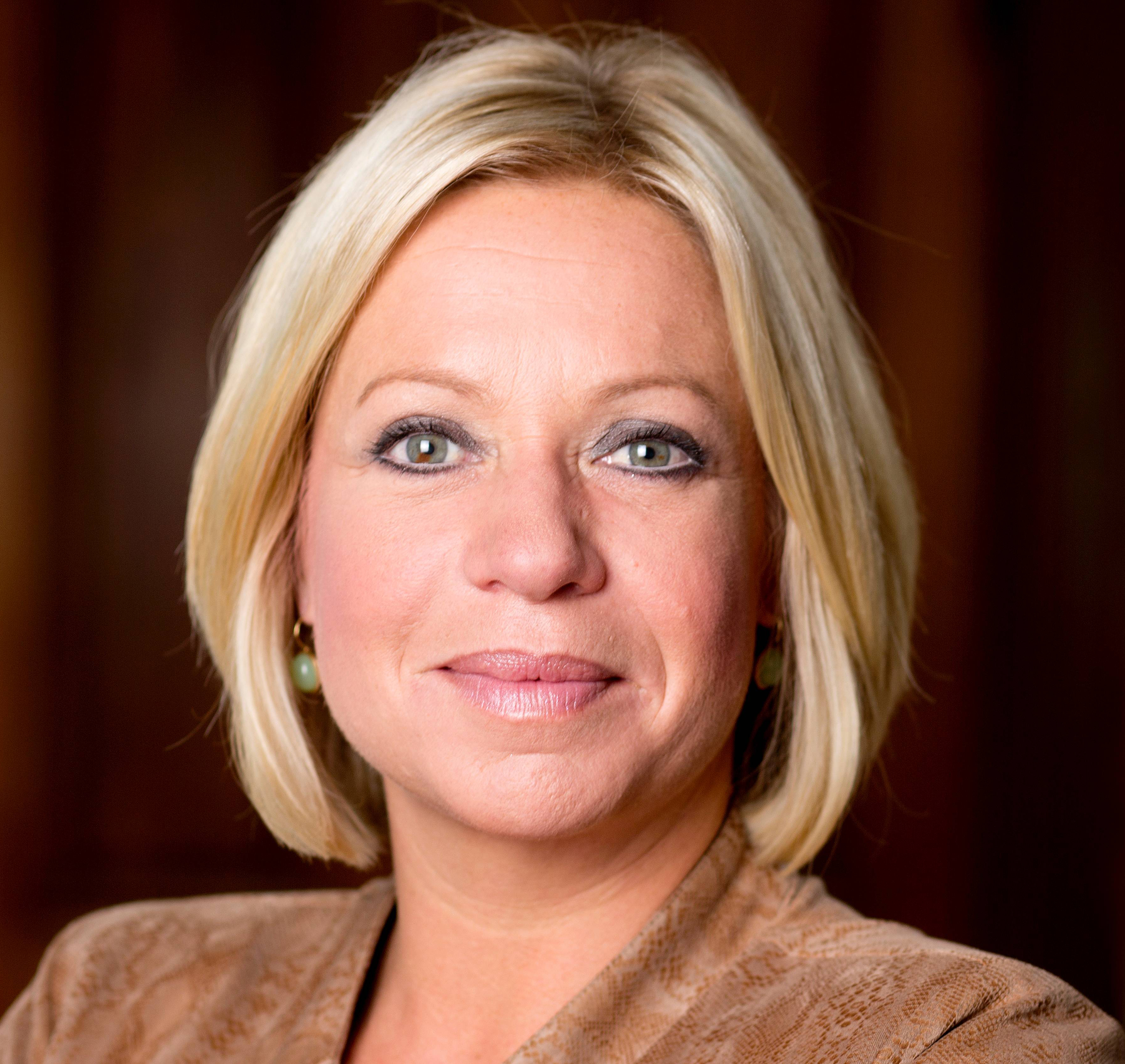
- Hennis-Plasschaert in 2015

United Nations Special Coordinator for Lebanon
- In office 20 May 2024 – 2026
- Secretary-General: António Guterres
- Preceded by: Joanna Wronecka

Special Representative for the United Nations Assistance Mission for Iraq
- In office 1 November 2018 – 17 May 2024
- Secretary-General: António Guterres
- Preceded by: Ján Kubiš

Minister of Defence
- In office 5 November 2012 – 4 October 2017
- Prime Minister: Mark Rutte
- Preceded by: Hans Hillen
- Succeeded by: Klaas Dijkhoff

Member of the House of Representatives
- In office 23 March 2017 – 13 September 2018
- In office 17 June 2010 – 5 November 2012

Member of the European Parliament
- In office 20 July 2004 – 17 June 2010
- Constituency: Netherlands

Personal details
- Born: Jeanine Antoinette Plasschaert; 7 April 1973 (age 53) Heerlen, Netherlands
- Party: People's Party for Freedom and Democracy
- Other party: Alliance of Liberals and Democrats for Europe
- Spouse: Erik-Jan Hennis (m. 2003)
- Children: 1 stepson
- Education: European Secretarial Academy

Military service
- Allegiance: Netherlands
- Branch/service: Royal Netherlands Navy
- Years of service: Reserve (2018–present)
- Rank: Commander

Jeanine Antoinette Hennis-Plasschaert (born 7 April 1973) is a Dutch politician of the People's Party for Freedom and Democracy (VVD) and diplomat who has been serving as United Nations Under-Secretary-General for Safety and Security under the leadership of Secretary General António Guterres since 2026.

Hennis-Plasschaert, a civil servant by occupation, was elected as a Member of the European Parliament for the Alliance of Liberals and Democrats for Europe group (ALDE) after the European Parliament election of 2004 on 20 July 2004; she was reelected after the European Parliament election of 2009. She was elected as a member of the House of Representatives after the general election of 2010 and resigned as a Member of the European Parliament the same day she took office as a Member of the House of Representatives on 17 June 2010.

Following the election of 2012 and after the cabinet formation the Second Rutte cabinet was formed with Hennis-Plasschaert becoming Minister of Defence. She stepped down as a member of the House of Representatives on 5 November 2012, the same day she took office as Minister of Defence. She served as Minister of Defence until her resignation on 4 October 2017. After the election of 2017 she returned as a member of the House of Representatives, serving from 23 March 2017 until 13 September 2018.

Hennis-Plasschaert served as Special Representative of the Secretary-General for the United Nations Assistance Mission for Iraq from 2018 and as United Nations Special Coordinator for Lebanon from 2024.

== Early life and education ==
Jeanine Antoinette Plasschaert was born in Heerlen, Netherlands. She followed her secondary education at the St. Anthony's College in Gouda and studied at the European Secretarial Academy in Utrecht.

== Political career ==
=== Member of the European Parliament, 2004–2010 ===
In 2004 Hennis-Plasschaert was elected into the European Parliament for the VVD (European parliamentary affiliation: European Liberal Democrat and Reform Party) with 44,000 preference votes. In the European Parliament Hennis-Plasschaert was a member of the Committee on Transport and Tourism and a substitute for the Committee on Civil Liberties, Justice and Home Affairs. She also served as a member of the Delegation to the EU-Romania Joint Parliamentary Committee and a substitute for the Delegation to the EU–Turkey Joint Parliamentary Committee.

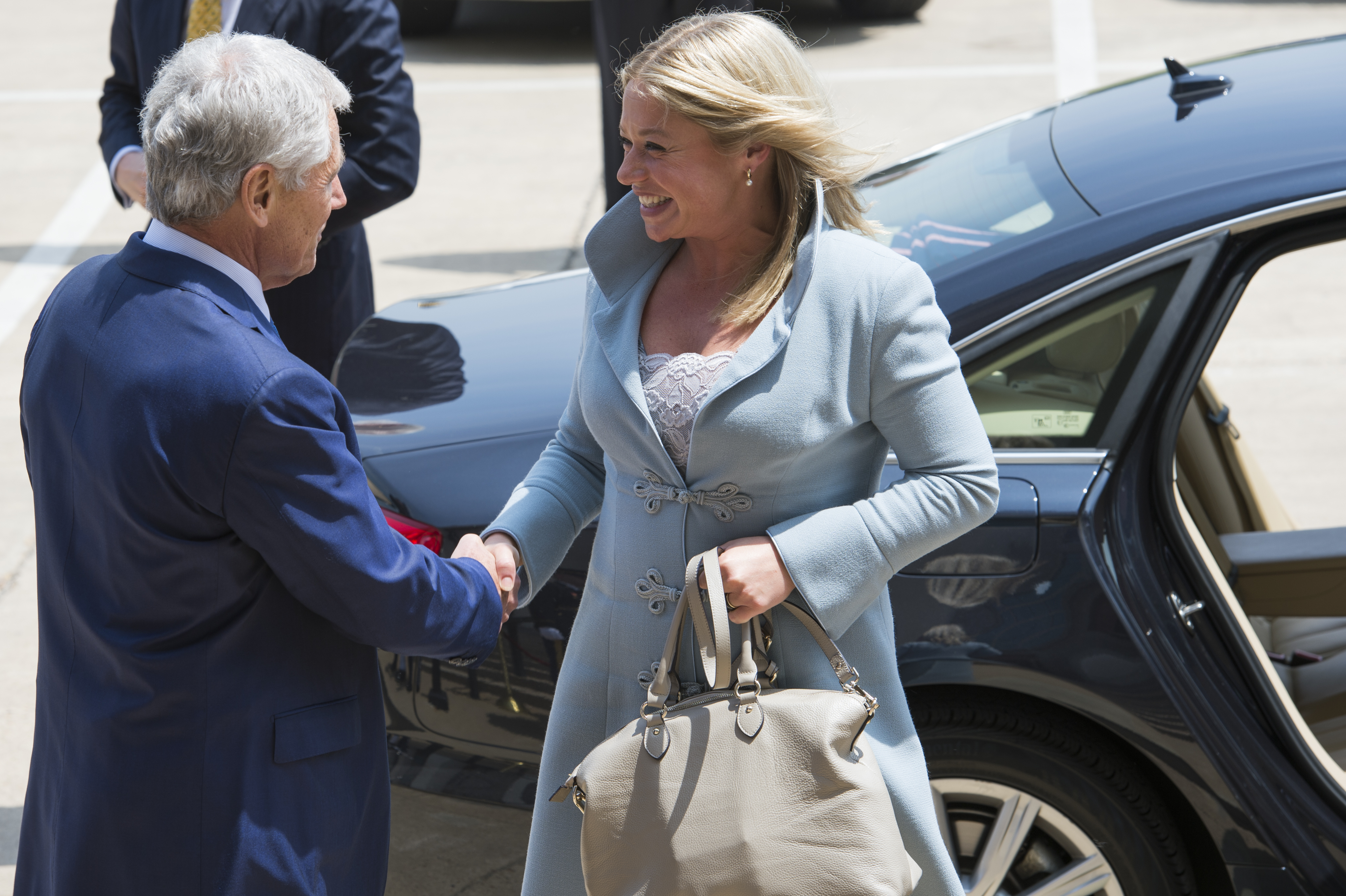
Jeanine Hennis-Plasschaert with United States Secretary of Defense Chuck Hagel on 22 May 2013.

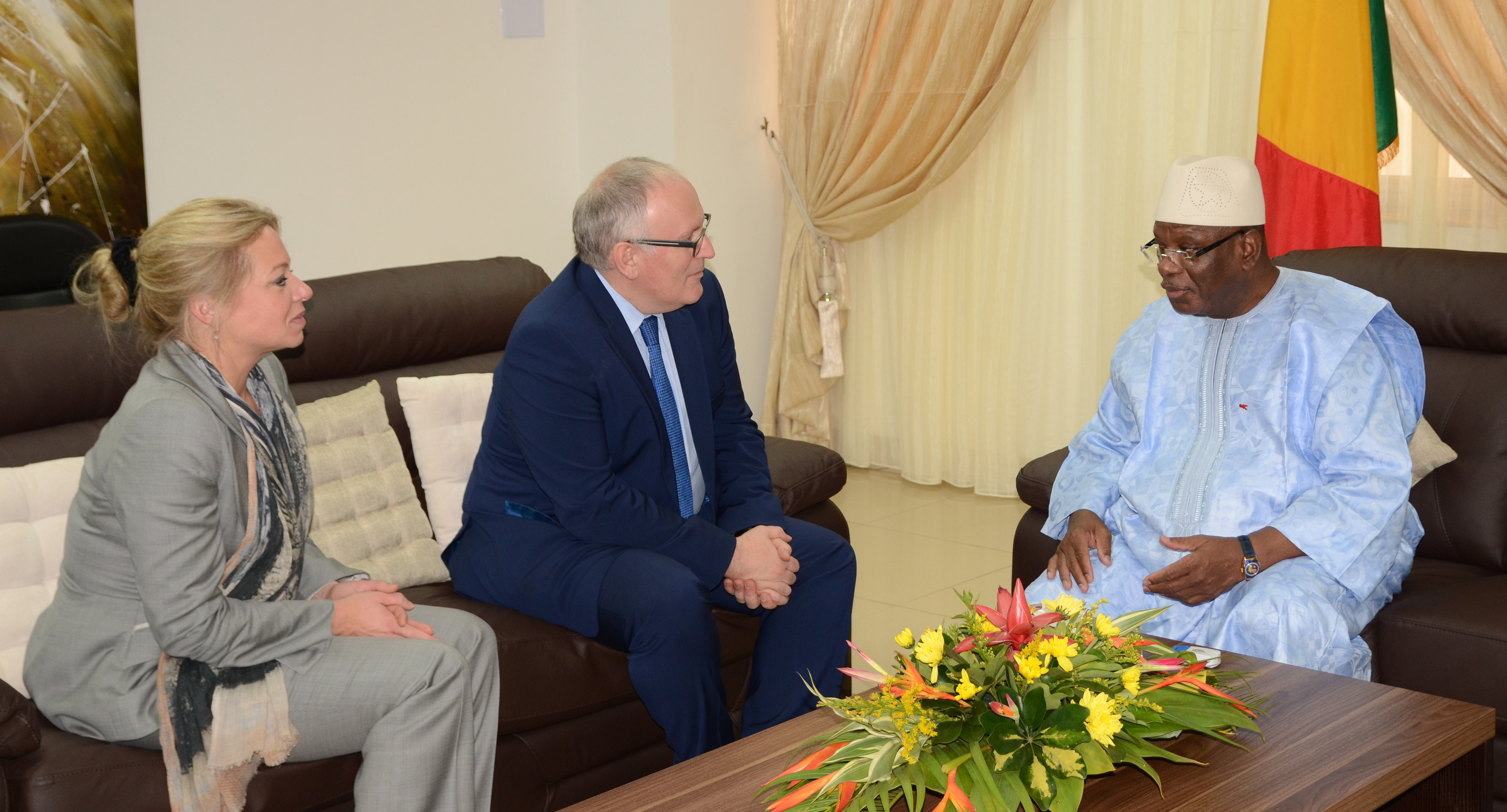
Jeanine Hennis-Plasschaert and then Minister of Foreign Affairs Frans Timmermans with President of Mali Ibrahim Boubacar Keïta on 28 November 2013.

In May 2005 Hennis-Plasschaert filed a report for the European Parliament concerning the safety of airports. She argued that safety regulations against terrorist attacks should only apply for airports, and not for the neighbouring areas. Furthermore, the costs and safety regulations should not distort free competition. In February 2006 she asked questions concerning the code of conduct for the media set up by the European Commission after the Jyllands-Posten Muhammad cartoons controversy. In March 2006 she wanted to enter Belarus to monitor the presidential election as an independent observer; however, she was refused entry.

In February 2010 Hennis-Plasschaert, as rapporteur on the issue, led the EP vote halting an EU-United States agreement which would have granted US authorities access to banking data of European citizens in the SWIFT network.

=== Career in national politics ===
Hennis-Plasschaert was put on the 4th place on her party's list for the Dutch general election of 2010 and became a member of the Dutch House of Representatives. She focused on matters of public safety, Dutch police, equality of treatment, LGBT rights, and emergency management. During the Dutch general election of 2012, she was number 4 on the list for the VVD and thus reelected. After the following cabinet formation she became the presumptive Minister of Defence for Cabinet Rutte II. In October 2015, she was named the most influential woman in the Netherlands.

Under Hennis-Plasschaert's leadership, the Netherlands committed in 2013 to purchasing 37 Lockheed Martin F-35 Lightning II fighter jets for about €4.5 billion to replace its ageing fleet of General Dynamics F-16 Fighting Falcon.

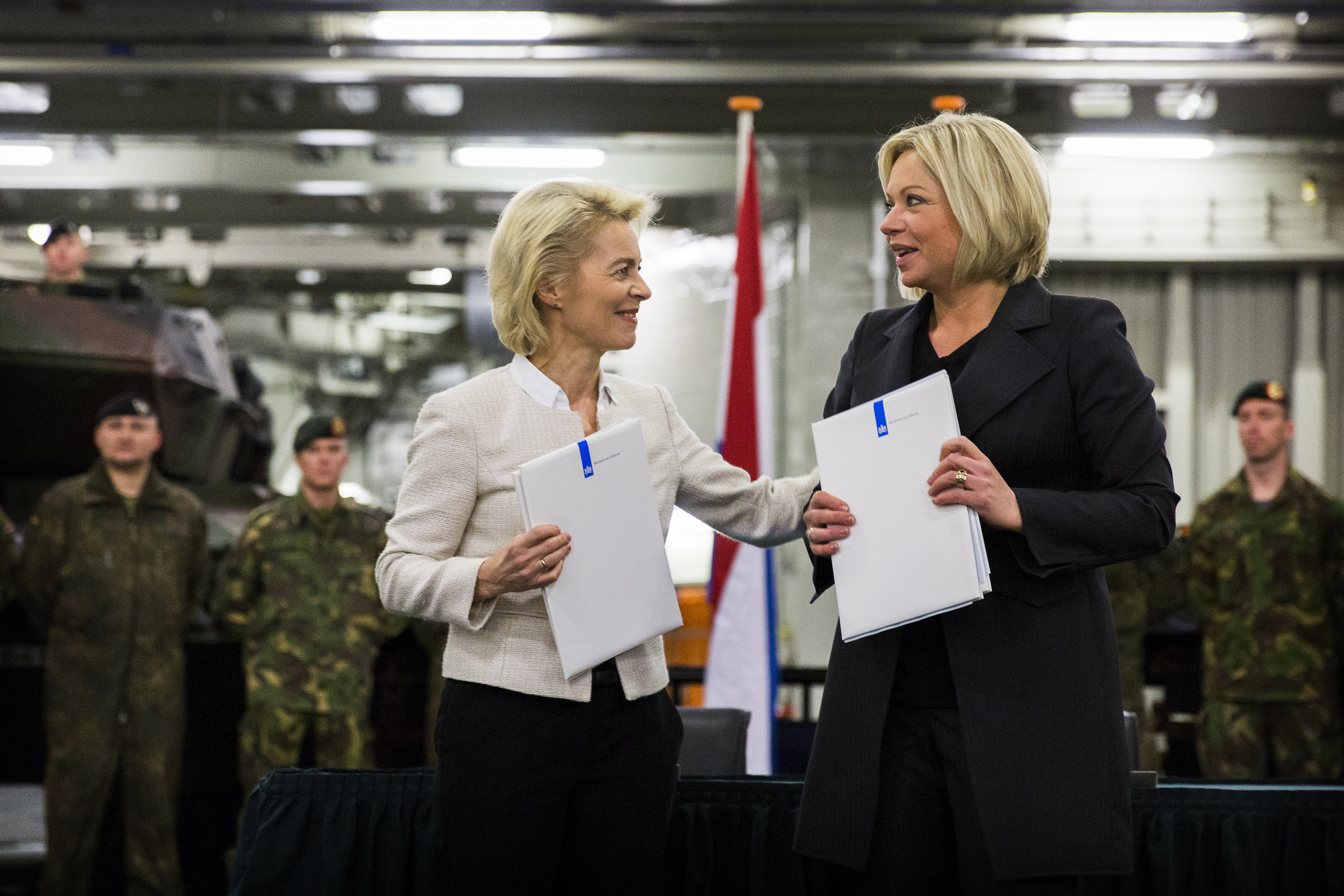
Hennis-Plasschaert with Ursula von der Leyen, 4 February 2016

From 2014, Hennis-Plasschaert oversaw the Dutch mission of six F-16 jet fighters that carried out airstrikes against Islamic State targets in Iraq. On 29 January 2016, she extended the airstrikes into Syria.

For the 2017 national elections, Hennis-Plasschaert was ranked number two on the VVD's candidate list. Later that year, however, the Dutch Safety Board published a report highlighting serious failures in the Ministry of Defence surrounding an artillery training accident in Mali that killed two Dutch peacekeeping troops and wounded a third. In the wake of the report, Hennis-Plasschaert ordered extra checks on ammunition and medical care for troops on missions. She also started to wind down the Dutch contribution to the United Nations Multidimensional Integrated Stabilization Mission in Mali (MINUSMA), to which she had initially provided Boeing AH-64 Apache helicopters in 2013. Confronting continued criticism, however, she eventually announced her resignation after a debate in the House of Representatives on 3 October, handing in her resignation the following day. Her resignation came as negotiations to form a new third coalition government under Minister-President Mark Rutte entered their final phase.

In July 2023, in the aftermath of Prime Minister Mark Rutte's resignation from national politics and as leader of the VVD, Hennis declined to run to become the next Leader of the People's Party for Freedom and Democracy.

== Career in the United Nations ==
In August 2018, Hennis-Plasschaert was appointed by United Nations Secretary-General António Guterres as his Special Representative for Iraq and Head of the United Nations Assistance Mission for Iraq (UNAMI), thereby succeeding Ján Kubiš.

In December 2019, Hennis-Plasschaert called for renewed efforts to restore civil balance and protections for free speech.

In a joint statement with the United Nations Assistance Mission for Iraq (UNAMI), Hennis-Plasschaert strongly condemned the August killings of two activists and attacks against others in the southern city of Basra. She urged for increased efforts to bring the perpetrators to justice.

On 28 January 2021, she visited the Independent High Electoral Commission (IHEC) in Baghdad. On 31 January 2021, she met Ali Akbar Velayati in Tehran, Iran, where she discussed the upcoming Iraqi parliamentary election.

Hennis-Plasschaert was appointed Special Coordinator for Lebanon on 20 May 2024 as the successor of Joanna Wronecka.

She condemned the 2024 Lebanon pager explosions, saying "civilians are not a target and must be protected at all times".

== Other activities ==
- Transatlantic Commission on Election Integrity (TCEI), Member (since 2018)
- World Economic Forum (WEF), Member of the Europe Policy Group (since 2017)
- World Economic Forum (WEF), Member of the Global Future Council on the Future of International Security

== Personal life ==
She has been married to economist Erik-Jan Hennis since 27 September 2003 and has a stepson. They live in Nederhorst den Berg.

Political offices
Preceded by Hans Hillen	Minister of Defence; 2012–2017	Succeeded by Klaas Dijkhoff
Diplomatic posts
Preceded by Ján Kubiš	Special Representative for the United Nations Assistance Mission for Iraq; 2018–2024	Succeeded by -
Preceded by Joanna Wronecka	United Nations Special Coordinator for Lebanon; 2024–present	Incumbent
