= United Nations Security Council Resolution 1913 =

UN Security Council Resolution 1913
- Chad (green), Central African Republic (blue) and Sudan (orange)
- Date: 12 March 2010
- Meeting no.: 6,283
- Code: S/RES/1913 (Document)
- Voting summary: 15 voted for; None voted against; None abstained
- Result: Adopted

Security Council composition
- Permanent members: China; France; Russia; United Kingdom; United States
- Non-permanent members: Austria; Bosnia–Herzegovina; Brazil; Gabon; Japan; Lebanon; Mexico; Nigeria; Turkey; Uganda

United Nations Security Council Resolution 1913, adopted unanimously on March 12, 2010, after recalling resolutions 1769 (2007), 1778 (2007), 1834 (2008) and 1861 (2009), the Council noted that the situation in the region of Darfur, Sudan and Chad and the Central African Republic constituted a threat to international peace and security, and therefore extended the mandate of the United Nations Mission in the Central African Republic and Chad (MINURCAT) for a further two months, until May 15, 2010.

MINURCAT had been established in 2007 under Resolution 1778 to provide security to hundreds of thousands of refugees from the war-torn Darfur region of Sudan, other displaced persons and humanitarian workers. The current resolution was passed amid discussions over the future of MINURCAT. Chad had asked for its mandate not to be renewed (but later agreed a two-month extension), while the United Nations argued that withdrawing the force too soon would leave refugees vulnerable and would undermine humanitarian operations.

== See also ==
- African Union – United Nations Hybrid Operation in Darfur
- Central African Republic Bush War
- Chadian Civil War (2005–2010)
- List of United Nations Security Council Resolutions 1901 to 2000 (2009–2011)
- United Nations Mission in Sudan
- War in Darfur
