= Tom Koenigs =

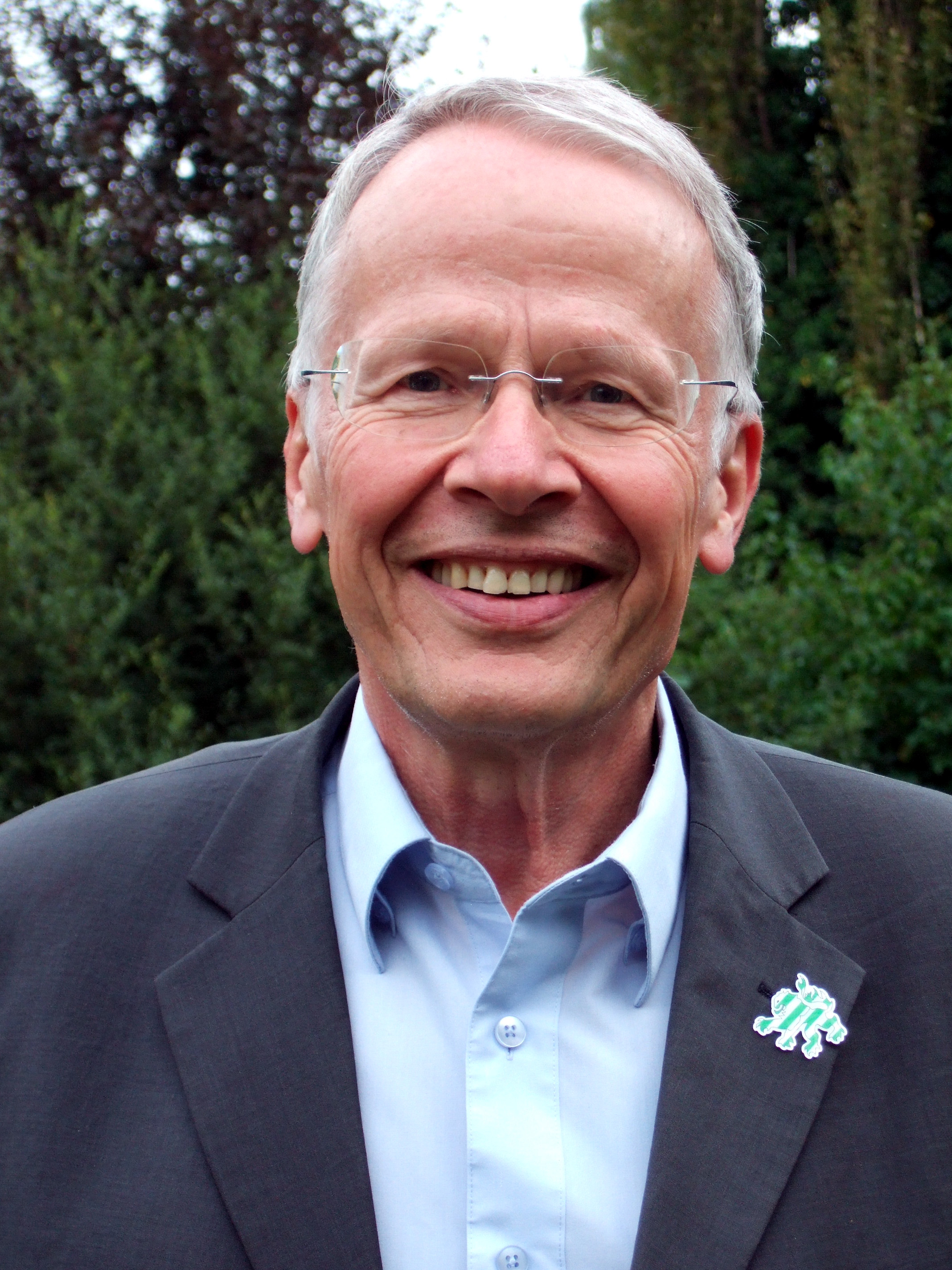

Member of the Bundestag
- Incumbent
- Assumed office 2009

Chair of the Committee on Human Rights and Humanitarian Aid
- In office 2009–2013

Personal details
- Born: Thomas Carl Joerge Koenigs; January 25, 1944 (age 82) Damm, Pomerania
- Education: Free University of Berlin
- Occupation: Politician

Tom Koenigs (Thomas Carl Joerge Koenigs; born January 25, 1944, in Damm, Pomerania) is a German politician and was a member of the Bundestag for the Alliance 90/The Greens (German: Bündnis 90/Die Grünen) parliamentary group. He was a full member of the Subcommittee on United Nations, International Organizations and Globalization. Koenigs was the human rights policy spokesman of the Bündnis 90/Die Grünen parliamentary group as of November 2013. From 1997 to 1999, Koenigs was the state executive spokesman of Bündnis 90/Die Grünen Hessen together with Sabine Giesa.

== Biography ==
Koenigs came from a banking family in Cologne. After graduating from the Birklehof boarding school in Hinterzarten and completing a banking apprenticeship in Düren, Koenigs did his basic military service; he subsequently refused to do military service. He studied business administration at the Free University of Berlin and later in Frankfurt am Main. There he participated in the student movement and took part in squats and street fights. In this context, Koenigs is said to have been active in the cleaning group organized largely by Joschka Fischer in the early 1970s. After graduating, he worked for a year and a half in shifts as a welder at Opel. In 1973, he donated his inheritance to the Vietcong and Chilean resistance fighters, according to him "something between 500,000 and five million marks". He then worked as a bookseller.

In the 1983 state election in Hesse he ran in the constituency of Frankfurt am Main I, where he received 6.1% of the vote. Koenigs was city treasurer from 1993 to 1997 and department head for Environment, Energy and Fire Protection of the City of Frankfurt am Main from 1989 to 1999. As head of the environment department, Koenigs played a leading role in the establishment of Frankfurt's green belt in 1991, the realization of which he retrospectively considers his greatest political success.

He then became active for the United Nations. As deputy special representative of the UN Secretary-General in Kosovo, he was responsible for establishing the local civil administration. In 2002 Koenigs was sent to Guatemala as a special representative to monitor compliance with the peace agreement by the former civil war parties as head of the UN peacekeeping mission MINUGUA.

In 2005 he moved to the Federal Foreign Office as the Federal Government Commissioner for Human Rights Policy and Humanitarian Aid.

From February 2006 to 2007 he was UN Special Representative for the United Nations Assistance Mission in Afghanistan (UNAMA).

On April 11, 2008, Koenigs was elected to the executive board of UNICEF Germany.

In November 2016 Koenigs provided a five-year guarantee for the legal entry of a Syrian war refugee as part of the Refugee Sponsors Syria initiative.

He has a particular fondness for Latin American literature, especially the writer Gabriel Garcia Marquez and Colombia. One of his sons was born in Colombia. The ex-politician is fluent in Spanish and has translated and published some of Marquez's columns into German.

Koenigs is the father of three adult children. His brother Wolf Koenigs is a building researcher and monument conservator.

=== Political career ===
On March 28, 2009, the state members' meeting of Bündnis 90/Die Grünen elected him to No. 4 on the Hessian state list for the 2009 Bundestag election. He succeeded in entering the German Bundestag in the election for the 17th German Bundestag on September 27, 2009, as well as in the election for the 18th German Bundestag on September 22, 2013.

In the 18th Bundestag Koenigs was the representative of his parliamentary group in the Committee on Human Rights and Humanitarian Aid and a full member of the Subcommittee on United Nations, International Organizations, and Globalization.

Koenigs was chair of the Committee on Human Rights and Humanitarian Aid and Full Member of the Defense Committee from 2009 to 2013. For the period from 2010 to 2014, he was seconded by the Bundestag to the Parliamentary Assembly of the Council of Europe. Koenigs announced in 2017 that he would not run again for the 2017 Bundestag election as a member of parliament. "We also need new ideas", said Koenigs, who was 73 at the time.
