= Parfait Onanga-Anyanga =

Gabonese diplomat

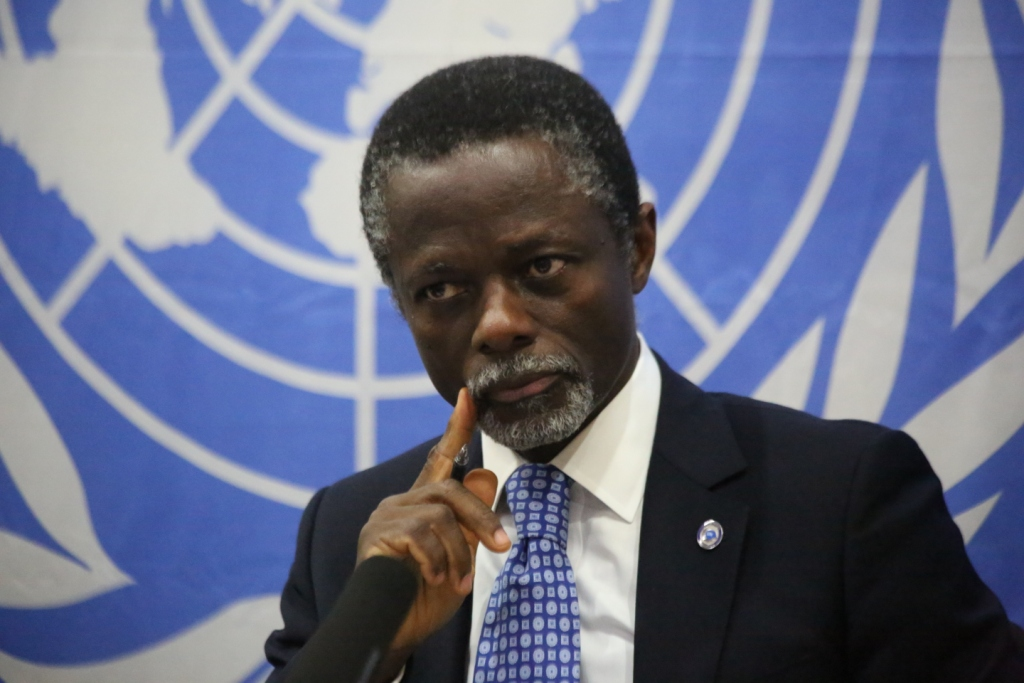
- Onanga-Anyanga in 2016

Special Representative of the Secretary-General to the African Union
- Incumbent
- Assumed office 22 February 2022
- Preceded by: Hanna Serwaa Tetteh

Head of the United Nations Office to the African Union
- Incumbent
- Assumed office 22 February 2022
- Preceded by: Hanna Serwaa Tetteh

Acting Special Representative of the Secretary-General for Central Africa
- Incumbent
- Assumed office 23 February 2026
- Preceded by: Abdou Abarry

Acting Head of the United Nations Regional Office for Central Africa
- Incumbent
- Assumed office 23 February 2026
- Preceded by: Abdou Abarry

Special Envoy of the Secretary-General for the Horn of Africa
- In office 13 March 2019 – 22 February 2022
- Preceded by: Hanna Serwaa Tetteh

Special Representative of the Secretary-General for the Central African Republic
- In office 7 January 2016 – 2019
- Preceded by: Babacar Gaye
- Succeeded by: Mankeur Ndiaye

Head of the United Nations Multidimensional Integrated Stabilization Mission in the Central African Republic (MINUSCA)
- In office 7 January 2016 – 2019
- Preceded by: Babacar Gaye
- Succeeded by: Mankeur Ndiaye

Acting Special Representative of the Secretary-General for the Central African Republic
- In office 16 August 2015 – 7 January 2016
- Preceded by: Babacar Gaye
- Succeeded by: Himself (substantive)

Personal details
- Born: 1960 (age 65–66) Gabon
- Education: Paris 1 Panthéon-Sorbonne University; Omar Bongo University
- Profession: Diplomat

Parfait Onanga-Anyanga is a Gabonese diplomat who has been serving as Special Representative of United Nations Secretary-General António Guterres to the African Union and Head of the United Nations Office to the African Union (UNOAU) since 2022.

== Education ==
Onanga-Anyanga holds a post graduate degree in political science from Paris 1 Pantheon-Sorbonne University and a master's degree in sociology from l’Université Omar Bongo in Libreville, Gabon.

== Career ==
During his time in the diplomatic service of Gabon, Onanga-Anyanga served as First Counsellor for Disarmament and Political Affairs at the Permanent Mission of Gabon to the United Nations in New York.

Parfait Onanga-Anyanga has extensive experience with the United Nations both in the field and at United Nations Headquarters in New York. Upon moving to the United Nations, he became the acting Secretary to the United Nations Standing Advisory Committee for Security Questions in Central Africa (UNSAC). From 1998 to 2004, he held a variety of political and managerial positions at the Preparatory Commission of the Comprehensive Nuclear-Test-Ban Treaty Organization in Vienna and New York. Onanga-Anyanga served in the Secretary-General's cabinet as a Director from 2007 to 2012 under Deputy Secretary-General of the United Nations Asha-Rose Mtengeti Migiro. He also worked in the Office of the President of the General Assembly from 2004 to 2007, with Gabon under former Chairperson of the African Union Commission, Jean Ping, and with Sweden under former Swedish Minister of Foreign Affairs, Jan Eliasson.

Appointed by United Nations Secretary-General Ban Ki-moon, Onanga-Anyanga served as the acting Special Representative for the United Nations Office in Burundi (BNUB) from 2012 until 2014. He later held the position of UN Coordinator for the response to the Boko Haram crisis.

From 2016 until 2019, Onanga-Anyanga served as the United Nations Special Representative for the Central African Republic and Head of the United Nations Multidimensional Integrated Stabilization Mission in the Central African Republic (MINUSCA).

From 2019 to 2022, Onanga-Anyanga served as for Guterres’ Special Envoy for the Horn of Africa.
