= Witold Spirydowicz =

Polish politician

Witold Spirydowicz Ph.D.
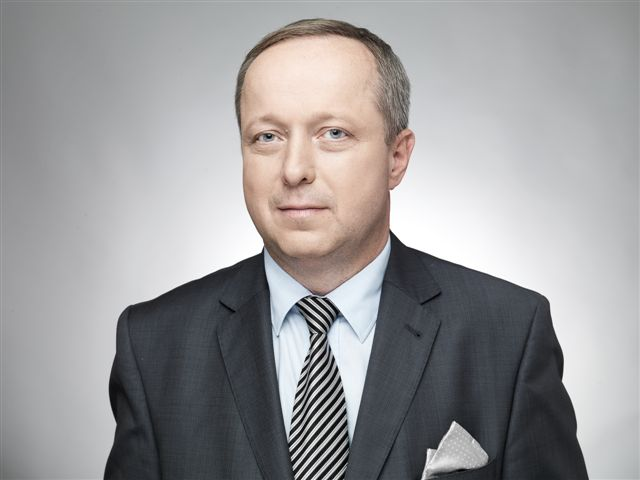
- (2010)

Poland Ambassador to Morocco
- In office 22 September 2010 – 31 July 2015
- Preceded by: Joanna Wronecka
- Succeeded by: Marek Aleksander Ziółkowski

Poland Ambassador to Algeria
- In office 6 July 2016 – 10 March 2023
- Preceded by: Michał Radlicki

Personal details
- Born: 5 October 1958 (age 67) Warsaw, Poland
- Children: Aldona
- Education: University of Warsaw
- Profession: Diplomat
- Awards: Pro Memoria Medal Officer of the Order of Merit of the Republic of Hungary Grand Cross of the Order of Ouissam Alaouite

Witold Czesław Spirydowicz (born 5 October 1958, Warsaw) is a Polish civil servant and diplomat, serving as an ambassador to Morocco (2010–2015) and Algeria (2016–2023).

== Education and career ==
Witold Spirydowicz has graduated from Law Faculty at the University of Warsaw (1981). He was member of the Independent Students' Union at that time. He has gained also postgraduate diplomas at the Faculty of Journalism and Political Science, UW (1983), Centre Européen Universitaire de Nancy (1983) and Diplomatic Academy – Polytechnic School of Central London (1990). In 1992, he defended his Ph.D. thesis on criminology. Besides Polish, he speaks English, French, German and Italian languages.

Between 1984 and 1990, he worked for the Institute of Justice of Warsaw, the Institute for Juvenile Research. In September 1990, he joined the Ministry of Foreign Affairs (MFA). Firstly, he was head of section at the Consular Department. Following working on a post at the embassy in Vienna (1992–1993), in 1993, he became First Secretary at the embassy in Bonn. In 1997, he returned to the MFA headquarter. Between 2000 and 2004, he was Consul-General in Montreal. For the next two years he has been at the Legal and Treaty Department. From 2006 to 2008, he was director of the department at the Office for War Veterans and Victims of Oppression. In January 2008, he returned to the MFA as a deputy director of the Director General's Office. The same year, in September, he became the director of the MFA Bureau of Control and Audit.

Between 2010 and 2015, he was Polish ambassador to Morocco. In 2016, he was invited by the president Andrzej Duda to the National Development Council. On 7 June 2016, he was nominated an ambassador to Algeria, accredited also to Chad and Niger. Next month, he began his term. He ended his term on 10 March 2023 and soon after took the post of the director of European Policy Department, MFA. He was the director until December 2023.

He is married, with daughter Aldona.

== Honours ==
- Pro Memoria Medal (2008)
- Officer of the Order of Merit of the Republic of Hungary (2014)
- Grand Cross of the Order of Ouissam Alaouite (2015)

== Works ==
Translations

- Hans Joachim Schneider, Zysk z przestępstwa: środki masowego przekazu a zjawiska kryminalne [original title: Massenmedien und Kriminalität], Warszawa: Wydawnictwo Naukowe PWN, 1992, ISBN 83-01-10602-6.
