= Ján Kubiš =

Slovak diplomat and foreign minister

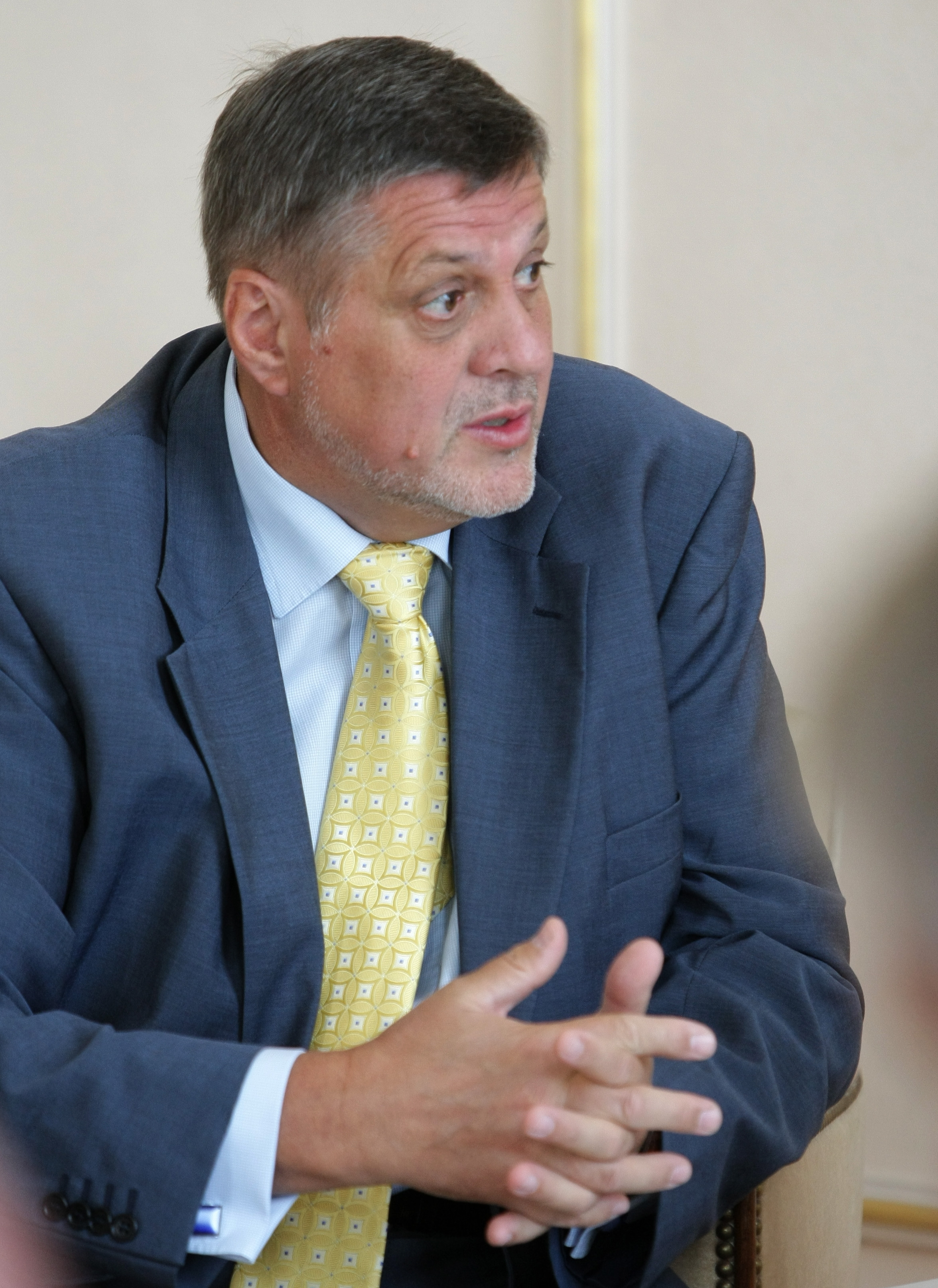
- Kubiš in 2011

Special Representative of the Secretary-General for the United Nations Assistance Mission in Iraq
- In office February 5, 2015 – November 1, 2018
- Secretary General: Ban Ki-moon
- Preceded by: Nickolay Mladenov
- Succeeded by: Jeanine Hennis-Plasschaert

Special Representative of the Secretary-General for the United Nations Assistance Mission in Afghanistan
- In office November 23, 2011 – November 1, 2014
- Secretary General: Ban Ki-moon
- Preceded by: Staffan de Mistura
- Succeeded by: Nicholas Haysom

Executive Secretary of the United Nations Economic Commission for Europe
- In office January 26, 2009 – November 23, 2011
- Secretary General: Ban Ki-moon
- Preceded by: Marek Belka
- Succeeded by: Sven Alkalaj

Minister of Foreign Affairs
- In office July 4, 2006 – January 26, 2009
- Prime Minister: Robert Fico
- Preceded by: Eduard Kukan
- Succeeded by: Miroslav Lajčák

European Union Special Representative for Central Asia
- In office July 28, 2005 – July 4, 2006
- President: José Manuel Barroso
- Preceded by: Position established
- Succeeded by: Pierre Morel

Secretary General of the Organization for Security and Co-operation in Europe
- In office June 15, 1999 – July 28, 2005
- Preceded by: Giancarlo Aragona
- Succeeded by: Marc Perrin de Brichambaut

Personal details
- Born: November 12, 1952 (age 73) Bratislava, Czechoslovakia (now Slovakia)
- Party: Direction-Social Democracy
- Spouse: Jaroslava Kubišová
- Children: 1
- Education: Moscow State Institute of International Relations

Ján Kubiš (born November 12, 1952) is a Slovak diplomat who served as Minister of Foreign Affairs of Slovakia from July 2006 until January 2009. Kubiš was appointed United Nations Special Coordinator for Lebanon in 2019 by António Guterres, the United Nations Secretary-General, and as head of the United Nations Support Mission in Libya in January 2021. He also currently serves as the Advisor to the President of Slovakia for Foreign Affairs since the assumption of Peter Pellegrini to the post in 2024.

== Early life ==
Born in 1952 in Bratislava, he is the elder of two children of Ján Kubiš, originally from Lučatín, and his mother Žofia, originally from Bardejov. He has a younger sister, Eva. He attended the Košická Elementary School and subsequently graduated from the Jura Hronca Gymnasium. Kubiš studied international economic relations at the Moscow State Institute of International Relations. He graduated with a degree in engineering in 1976. During his studies in Moscow, he became a member of the Communist Party of Czechoslovakia. From 1976 to 1992, he worked at the Ministry of Foreign Affairs of the Czechoslovak Socialist Republic.

== Career ==
=== Career in the Slovak diplomatic service ===
From 1991 to 1992, Kubiš was Director-General of the Euro-Atlantic Section in the Ministry of Foreign Affairs in Prague. From 1989, he served in the Czechoslovak Embassy in Moscow, and as Deputy Head of the Embassy from 1990 until his departure in 1991. Between 1985 and 1988, he headed the section dealing with security and arms control in the Czechoslovak Foreign Ministry. From 1980 to 1985, he served in the Czechoslovak Embassy in Addis Ababa, Ethiopia.

In 1992, Kubiš served as Chairman-in-Office of the Committee of Senior Officials of the Committee on Security and Cooperation in Europe (CSCE) under the Czechoslovak CSCE chairmanship. From 1993 to 1994, he was Ambassador and Permanent Representative of the Slovak Republic to the UN Office in Geneva, as well as to the General Agreement on Tariffs and Trade and other international organizations. In 1994, he was Special Ministerial Envoy and Slovak Chief Negotiator on the Pact for Stability in Europe.

=== Career with the OSCE ===
Kubiš was formerly Organization for Security and Co-operation in Europe (OSCE) Secretary General. In July 2005, the European Union appointed Kubiš to be the EU's special envoy to Central Asia. Kubiš had previously served as the United Nations special envoy to Tajikistan from 1998 to 1999, during the transitional period following the civil war until the country held its first postwar elections.

Prior to taking on the post as OSCE Secretary General, Kubiš was Director of the Conflict Prevention Centre in the secretariat of the OSCE, a position he held from 1994.

=== Career with the United Nations ===
Kubiš served as the Executive Secretary of the United Nations Economic Commission for Europe.

From 2015 until 2018, Kubiš served as the Special Representative and Head of the United Nations Assistance Mission in Iraq (UNAMI); he was appointed to this position by United Nations Secretary-General Ban Ki-moon on February 5, 2015. He was also the Special Representative and Head of the United Nations Assistance Mission in Afghanistan (UNAMA).

Later on, Kubiš served as the Special Representative of the Secretary-General for the United Nations Assistance Mission in Iraq (2015–2018), United Nations Special Coordinator for Lebanon in 2019, and head of the United Nations Support Mission in Libya in 2021. He resigned from the Libya mission on November 23, 2021, less than a year after he took up the role and a month before planned elections in the country.

== Personal life ==
Kubiš is married and has one daughter.

== Awards ==
- Honorary Doctorate from the University of Economics in Bratislava (2013)
- Commander of the Legion of Honor (France, 2012)
- Order of Friendship, 2nd class (Kazakhstan, 2012)
- Decoration of Honour for Services to the Republic of Austria (Austria, 2006)
- Order of Friendship (Tajikistan, 30 August 2007)

Diplomatic posts
Preceded by Giancarlo Aragona	Secretary General of the Organization for Security and Co-operation in Europe; 1999–2005	Succeeded by Marc Perrin de Brichambaut
New office	European Union Special Representative for Central Asia; 2005–2006	Succeeded by Pierre Morel
Preceded by Marek Belka	Executive Secretary of the United Nations Economic Commission for Europe; 2009–2011	Succeeded by Sven Alkalaj
Preceded by Staffan de Mistura	Special Representative of the Secretary-General for the United Nations Assistance Mission in Afghanistan; 2011–2014	Succeeded by Nicholas Haysom
Preceded by Nickolay Mladenov	Special Representative of the Secretary-General for the United Nations Assistance Mission in Iraq; 2015–2018	Succeeded by Jeanine Hennis-Plasschaert
Political offices
Preceded by Eduard Kukan	Minister of Foreign Affairs; 2006–2009	Succeeded by Miroslav Lajčák
