= Damilola Ogunbiyi =

Nigerian sustainable energy advocate

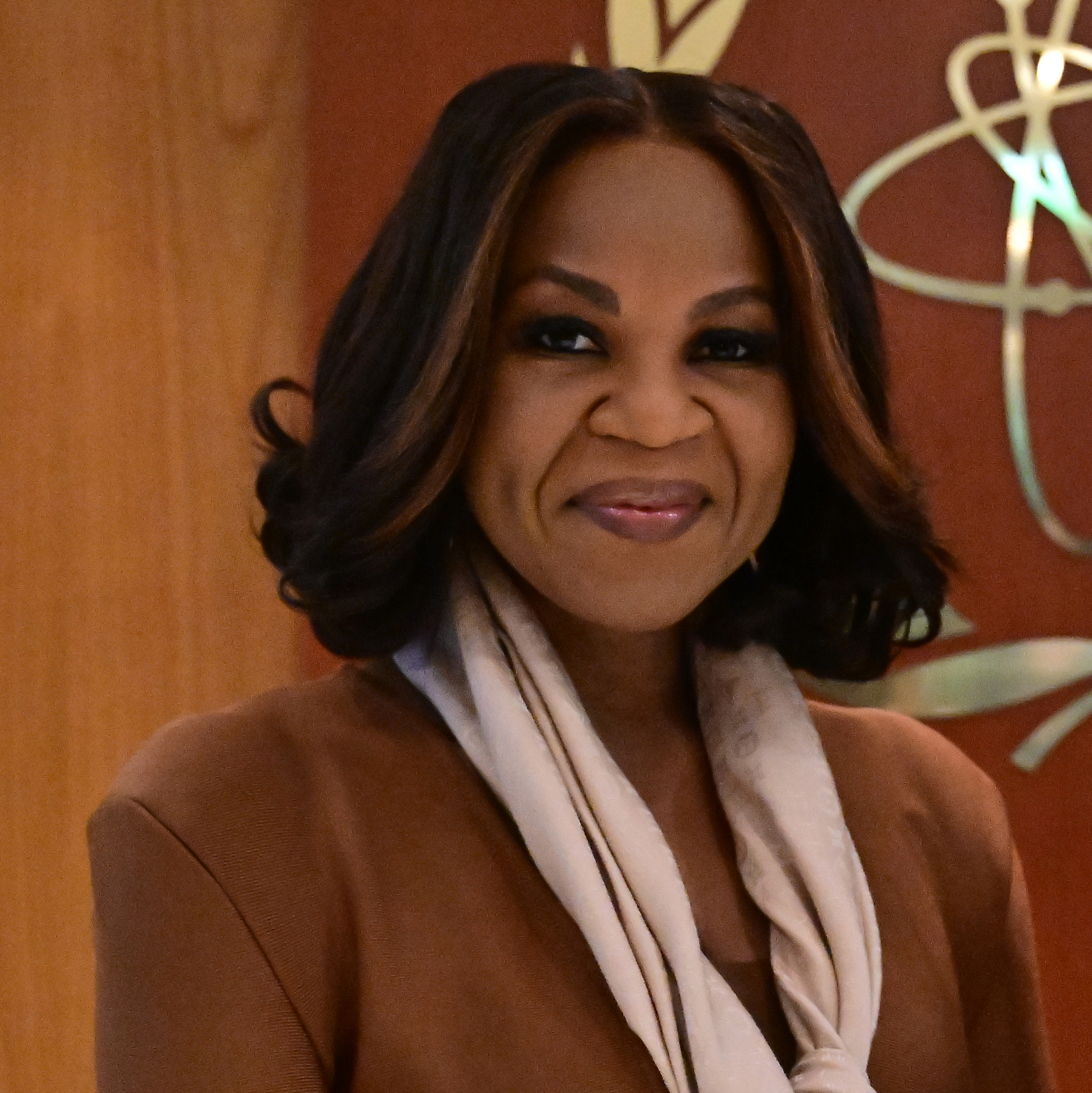
- in 2026
- Born: Damilola Ogunbiyi; Nigeria
- Known for: Special Representative of the Secretary-General

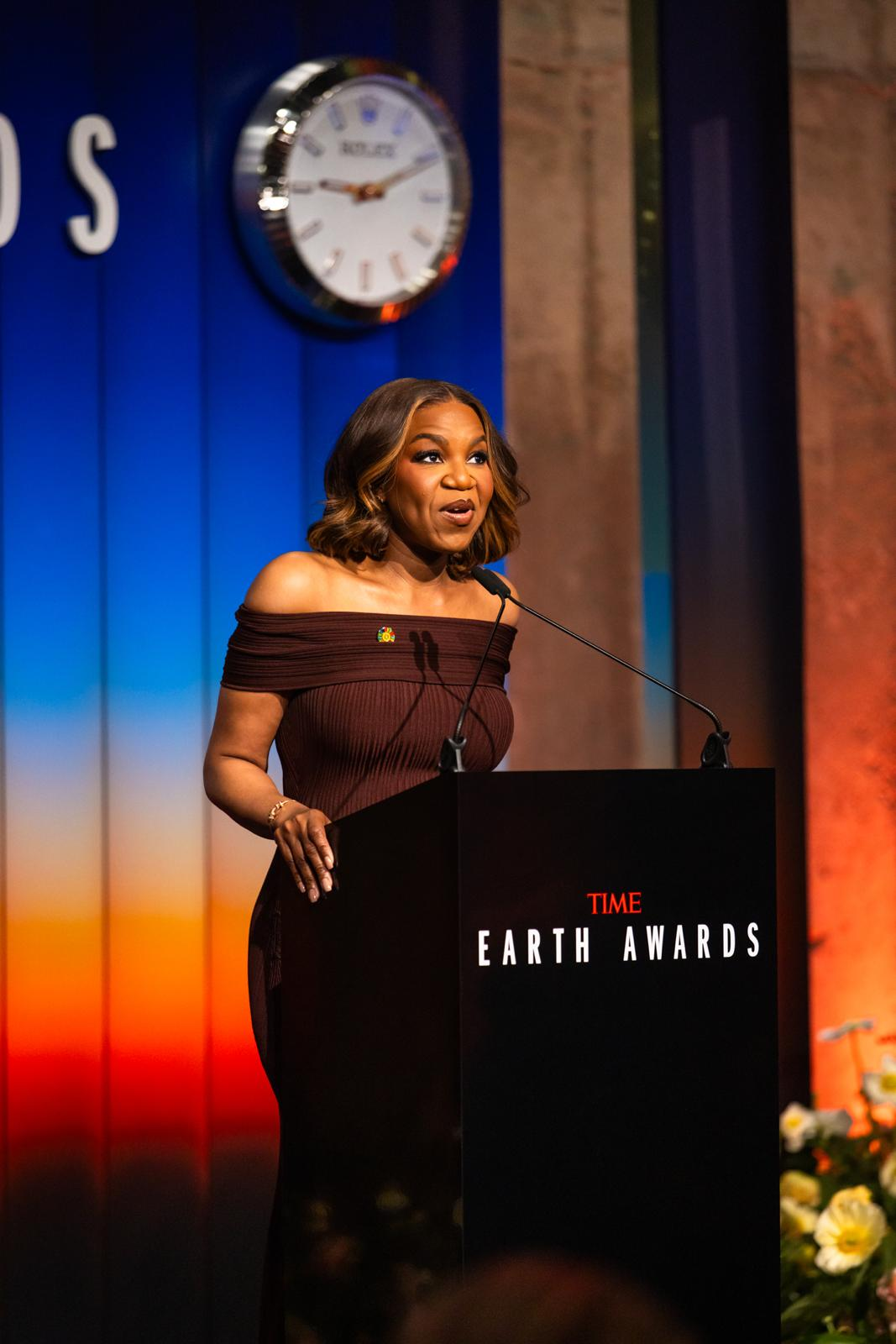
Damilola Ogunbiyi named as one of four honorees of the 2026 TIME Earth Awards

Damilola Ogunbiyi HonFREng is the Special Representative of the Secretary-General for Sustainable Energy for All and Co-Chair of UN-Energy.

== Life ==
Ogunbiyi was born in Nigeria and she graduated in 2001 and in the following year she obtained a masters degree at the University of Brighton in Project Management for Construction. She became the first female General Manager of the Lagos State Electricity Board.

Ogunbiyi was the first female Managing Director of the Nigerian Rural Electrification Agency where she managed a Nigerian Electrification Project. This was a $550 million World Bank and African Development Bank programme. It has provided energy access to over 8 million people across Nigeria.

In 2022 she was one of five new honorary fellows of the Royal Academy of Engineering.

Ogunbiyi became a member of the World Bank’s Private Sector Investment Lab, a member of the European Investment Bank Climate and Environment Advisory Council, a member of the Global Leadership Council (GLC) of the Global Energy Alliance for People and Planet (GEAPP), an Advisory Board member of the Center on Global Energy Policy at Columbia University, a member of the Development Advisory Council of the U.S. International Development Finance Corporation (DFC), a member of the Clean Cooking Alliance Advisory Board, a member of the WHO High Level Coalition on Energy (HEPA), and an advisory council member of the Women in Sustainability, Environment and Renewable Energy Advisory Council (WISER). She was part of the COP28 Advisory Committee and was Co-Chair of the COP26 Energy Transition Council (ETC).

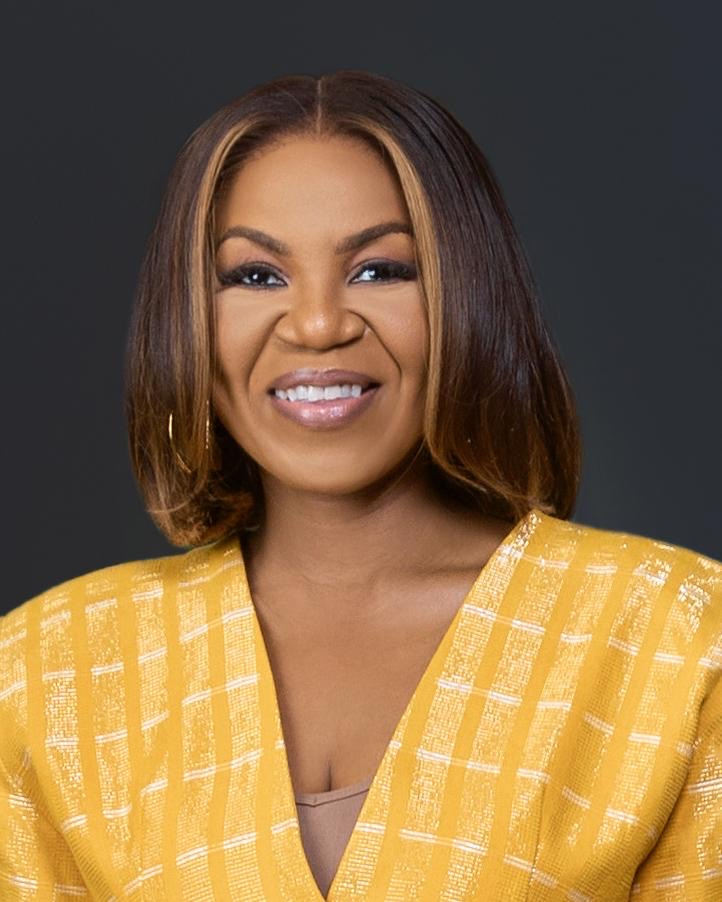
Damilola Ogunbiyi in 2026

She is the Chief Executive Officer of Sustainable Energy for All and the Special Representative of the Secretary-General for Sustainable Energy for All. She is Co-Chair of UN-Energy. She argues that nearly 90% of the 666 million people who live without electricity are in the Global South. She wants to see this all changed by 2030.

In 2026 she was named by TIME Magazine as an honoree of their TIME Earth Awards, in 2025 she was named by Forbes in their 50 Sustainability Leaders list, and in 2024 she was named by TIME Magazine in their 100 Most Influential Climate Leaders in Business.

== Career ==
- 2008–2010 – Consultant, Department for International Development, Government of the United Kingdom
- 2010–2011 – Senior Special Assistant on PPP to the Governor of Lagos State, Lagos State Government
- 2011–2015 – General Manager, Lagos State Electricity Board, Lagos State Government
- 2015–2019 – Senior Special Assistant to the President of Nigeria and Head of Advisory Power Team, Office of the Vice President, Federal Government of Nigeria
- 2017–2019 – Managing Director, Rural Electrification Agency, Federal Government of Nigeria
- 2020 – Chief Executive Officer, Sustainable Energy for All
- 2020 – Co-Chair, UN-Energy
- 2020 – Special Representative of the Secretary-General for Sustainable Energy for All, United Nations
- 2020 – Member of the Clean Cooking Alliance Advisory Board
- 2020 – Member of the Development Advisory CouncilMember of the Development Advisory Council of the U.S. International Development Finance Corporation
- 2021 – Advisory Board Member of the Center on Global Energy Policy at Columbia University
- 2022 – Member of the European Investment Bank Climate and Environment Advisory Council
- 2022 – Member of the Global Leadership Council (GLC)Member of the Global Leadership Council (GLC) of the Global Energy Alliance for People and Planet (GEAPP)
- 2023 – Member of the World Bank’s Private Sector Investment Lab
