= Jean Arnault =

French diplomat and writer

Jean Arnault is a French diplomat who currently serves as United Nations Secretary-General António Guterres' Personal Envoy to lead United Nations efforts on the conflict in the Middle East and its consequences as well as United Nations Special Coordinator for Lebanon; previously he served as Guterres' Personal Envoy on Afghanistan and Regional Issues.

== Early life and education ==
Arnault studied philosophy, Linguistics and Political Science and graduated in philosophy from University of Sorbonne-Paris I. He holds a postgraduate diploma in conference interpretation from the Polytechnic of Central London-University of Westminster.

== Career ==
Arnault worked as Senior Political Affairs Officer in Namibia, Afghanistan and Western Sahara from 1989 to 1991.

Arnault was Observer and then Mediator in the Guatemala peace negotiations from 1992 to 1996, when the Guatemalan Peace Accords were signed. He later served as Special Representative of the United Nations Secretary General Kofi Annan for Guatemala and Head of the United Nations Verification Mission in Guatemala (MINUGUA) from 1997 to 2000. In 1997, Guatemalan human rights accused Arnault and the UN of having helped the rebels and the government cover up a political killing that was part of a crisis that nearly scuttled the peace plan; Arnault rejected the allegations.

Arnault served as Representative of the Secretary General for Burundi and Head of the United Nations Office in Burundi (BNUB) from 2000 to 2001. In the following years, he was the United Nations Special Adviser to the Friends of Democratic Pakistan from 2008 to 2009; Special Representative of the Secretary General in Georgia and Head of the United Nations Observer Mission in Georgia (UNOMIG) from 2006 to 2008, succeeding Heidi Tagliavini; Special Representative of the Secretary General in Afghanistan and Head of the United Nations Assistance Mission in Afghanistan (UNAMA) from 2004 to 2006, where he was also Deputy in 2002–2003.

From November 2014 to June 2015 Arnault was a member of the Independent High-Level Panel on Peace Operations appointed by UN Secretary-General Ban Ki-moon and chaired by José Ramos-Horta to review and make recommendations on UN field operations in the areas of prevention, mediation, peacebuilding and peacekeeping.

Arnault subsequently was the UN Secretary-General's Delegate to the Sub-Commission on End of Conflict issues in the Colombia Peace Talks, in which he served from August 2015 to April 2016. From May 2016 until September 2017, he was the Head of the UN Mission in Colombia mandated to verify the implementation of the Agreement on the Definitive and Bilateral Ceasefire and Cessation of Hostilities and Laying down of Arms signed by the Government of Colombia under President Juan Manuel Santos and the Revolutionary Armed Forces of Colombia (FARC-EP) on 24 June 2016. At the end of December 2018 he had completed his assignment as Special Representative of the Secretary-General for Colombia and Head of the UN Verification Mission in Colombia, established by the Security Council in July 2017 to verify the reintegration of former combatants from the FARC-EP and the security guarantees for communities in the conflict areas. From November 2019 to December 2020, he served as the Personal Envoy of the Secretary-General for Bolivia.

=== Afghanistan and the Middle East ===
In March 2021, Secretary General António Guterres brought Arnault back to Afghanistan as Personal Envoy on Afghanistan and Regional Issues to support UNAMA, Special Representative of the Secretary General Deborah Lyons, and the negotiations and implementation of any agreements between the Taliban and Afghanistan. In March 2026, Guterres appointed Arnault to be his Personal Envoy to lead United Nations efforts on the conflict in the Middle East and its consequences. Later that year, Arnault was appointed as interim United Nations Special Coordinator for Lebanon.

== Other activities ==
In 2001, Arnault was a visiting fellow at the Centre for International Studies at Princeton University where he focused on lessons for mediators from peace processes in the 90s. See "Good Agreement, Bad Agreement? an Implementation Perspective, 2001".

From 2011 to 2013 Arnault was Professor of Practice at the Paris School of International Affairs Sciences Po Paris, where he taught International Mediation, and the Settlement of Civil Wars.

He is a non-resident Senior Fellow at the Center on International Cooperation (CIC) of New York University and a member of the Council of the University for Peace headquartered in Costa Rica.
