= Détachement Intégré de Sécurité =

United Nations supported security force

Détachement Intégré de Sécurité (DIS) is a United Nations supported Security force in Chad, responsible for securing Internally Displaced Person (IDP) sites and nearby towns in Eastern Chad.

== Formation ==
According to the UN Security Council Resolution 1778, adopted September 25, 2007, the United Nations was to establish a multidimensional force in Chad known as MINURCAT (United Nations Mission in the Central African Republic and Chad). One of the mandates of Resolution 1778 was for MINURCAT to select, train, advise and provide support to elements of the Chadian police force and gendarmerie who would eventually take part in the Détachement Intégré de Sécurité, a security force meant to protect Refugee's and internally displaced people. On April 9, MINURCAT initiated the training of Chadian commanders to take part in DIS. A total of 77 Chadian police men and gendarmerie took part in the program, which consisted of an intensive four week course of training and learning of law and order and respect for human rights.
