= Guang Cong =

Guang Cong is a Chinese international affairs expert currently serving as the United Nations Secretary-General Special Envoy for the Horn of Africa appointed by António Guterres in July 2025 succeeding Hanna Serwaa Tetteh of Ghana.

== Education ==
Cong attended Shanghai International Studies University, China where he studied for a Bachelor of Arts degree and earned a Graduate Certificate from China Foreign Affairs University.

== Career ==
Cong began his career at the Ministry of Foreign Affairs of China before joining the United Nations in 2002 as head of Field Offices and Political Affairs Officer at the United Nations Assistance Mission in Afghanistan (UNAMA) serving there until 2009. He served as Chief of Political Affairs and Chief of Staff at the United Nations Special Coordinator’s Office in Lebanon (UNSCOL) from 2012 to 2014 and served at the UNMISS offices in Jonglei and Blue Nile States and Abyei office of the United Nations Mission in Sudan (UNMIS) before being appointed as Chief of Civil Affairs of the United Nations African Union Hybrid Mission in Darfur (UNAMID). From 2016 to 2020, Cong served as director of Civil Affairs at UNMISS.

From 2020, he served as Deputy Special Representative (Political) for South Sudan and as Deputy Head of the United Nations Mission in South Sudan (UNMISS) until July 2025, when he was appointed Special Envoy of the UN Secretary-General for the Horn of Africa.
