= Office of the United Nations Special Coordinator for Lebanon =

The Office of the United Nations Special Coordinator for Lebanon UNSCOL is the political office of the United Nations that organizes the work of the UN in Lebanon. The Special Coordinator for Lebanon is the Secretary-General's representative to the Lebanese Government, as well as to all political parties and the broader diplomatic community hosted in the country. It has offices located in Yarze, three minutes from Beirut.

== Leadership ==
- Geir Otto Pedersen: (2007–2008)
- Michael Williams (2008–2012)
- Derek Plumbly (2012–2015)
- Sigrid Kaag (2015–2017)
- Pernille Dahler Kardel (2017–2019) (Acting)
- Ján Kubiš (2019–2021)
- Joanna Wronecka (2021–2024)
- Jeanine Hennis-Plasschaert (2024–2026)
- Jean Arnault (2026-present) (interim)

=== Deputy ===
- Najat Rochdi: (2020–2022)
- Imran Riza: (2022–present)
