= United Nations Security Council Resolution 1606 =

UN Security Council Resolution 1606
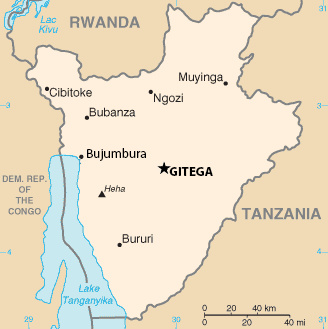
- Burundi
- Date: 20 June 2005
- Meeting no.: 5,207
- Code: S/RES/1606 (Document)
- Subject: The situation in Burundi
- Voting summary: 15 voted for; None voted against; None abstained
- Result: Adopted

Security Council composition
- Permanent members: China; France; Russia; United Kingdom; United States
- Non-permanent members: Algeria; Argentina; Benin; Brazil; Denmark; Greece; Japan; Philippines; Romania; Tanzania

United Nations Security Council resolution 1606, adopted unanimously on 20 June 2005, after reaffirming its support for the Arusha Peace Agreement regarding the situation in Burundi, the Council requested the Secretary-General Kofi Annan to begin negotiations on a truth commission and special chamber within the country's court system.

== Resolution ==
=== Observations ===
For the purposes of peace and reconciliation in Burundi, the council was convinced that the establishment of a truth commission to bring those responsible for genocide, crime against humanity and war crimes to justice in order to end impunity in the African Great Lakes region. It also noted that international assistance was necessary to establish a society and government under the rule of law. The transitional government of Burundi called for a mixed truth commission and a special chamber within the Burundian judicial system.

=== Acts ===
The secretary-general was asked to begin discussions with the transitional government and other parties on how to implement the recommendations of the government, and to report by 30 September 2005 with details of its implementation, including costs, structures and a time frame.

== See also ==
- Burundi Civil War
- List of United Nations Security Council Resolutions 1601 to 1700 (2005–2006)
- Truth and Reconciliation Commission (Burundi)
- United Nations Integrated Office in Burundi
