= United Nations Assistance Mission in Afghanistan =

Ongoing UN peacekeeping mission in Afghanistan

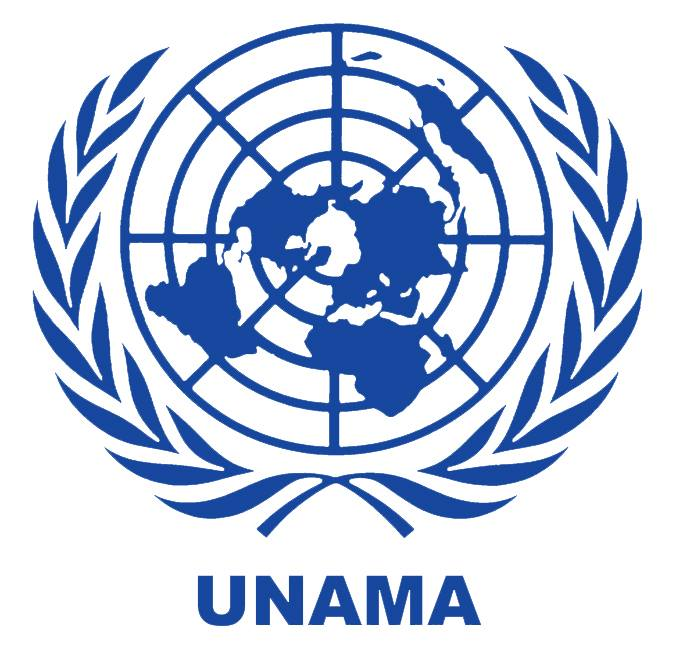
- Abbreviation: UNAMA
- Formation: 28 March 2002
- Type: Political mission
- Legal status: extended UNAMA until 17 June 2027
- Headquarters: Kabul, Afghanistan
- Head: Rabab Fatima
- Parent organization: United Nations Security Council
- Website: http://unama.unmissions.org/

The United Nations Assistance Mission in Afghanistan (UNAMA) is a UN Special Political Mission tasked with assisting the people of Afghanistan. It is headquartered in the capital, Kabul, and maintains a field presence across the country; it also has liaison offices in neighboring Iran and Pakistan. In October 2026, Abdul Ghani Baradar announced in the media that UNAMA is being hostile to the current Islamic Emirate of Afghanistan.

UNAMA was established on 28 March 2002 by United Nations Security Council (UNSC) Resolution 1401. It replaced the United Nations Special Mission to Afghanistan and was mandated to provide political, administrative, and humanitarian support to Afghanistan.

Reviewed annually, this mandate has been consistently extended and altered over time to reflect the needs of the country; it was most recently extended for one year, on 17 March 2025, by the UNSC 2777 (2025). In 2023, the UNSC passed a resolution recognizing the important role that the United Nations will continue to play in promoting peace and stability in Afghanistan; later that year, a subsequent resolution called for an integrated and independent assessment with forward-looking recommendations for an "integrated and coherent approach" to address Afghanistan's challenges.

The United Nations had been involved in the region since 1946 when Afghanistan joined the General Assembly. Agencies such as UNICEF have been operating in Afghanistan since 1949.

== Structure ==
UNAMA's headquarters is in Kabul and it maintains a field presence across Afghanistan, as well as liaison offices in Pakistan and Iran. The Mission has around 782 staff: 508Afghan nationals, 186 international staff, 58 international UNVs and 30 national UNVs (Figures from October 2026). The Mission has offices in Bamyan, Fayzabad, Gardez, Herat, Mazar-i-Sharif, Kabul, Kandahar, Kunduz, Maimana, Puli Khumri, and Jalalabad. The UNAMA opened a temporary remote office in Almaty, Kazakhstan in September 2021 to continue international humanitarian cooperation as result of the Taliban takeover.

Since 2008, and following a directive of the UN Secretary-General, UNAMA is an integrated mission. This means that the Special Political Mission, all UN agencies, funds and programmes, work in a multidimensional and integrated manner to better assist Afghanistan according to nationally defined priorities.

The SRSG is responsible for all UN activities in the country and directly oversees the Security Section, Strategic Communication Service, Human Rights Section, and Peace and Reconciliation. The SRSG's Chief of Staff oversees UNAMA's Field Offices.

Two deputy Special Representatives (DSRSG) oversee the main pillars of the mission – political and developmental issues. Included under these pillars are mission sections specializing in issues such as political analysis, reporting, and outreach, and donor coordination, as well as the coordination of UN agencies funds and programmes.

=== Leadership ===
As of 17 October 2026, UNAMA is headed by Rabab Fatima as the Special Representative of the Secretary-General (SRSG) for Afghanistan.

Nine Special Representatives preceded her – Lakhdar Brahimi who served from October 2001 to January 2004, despite resigning from the post 2 years earlier; Jean Arnault who held the post from February 2004 to February 2006, followed by Tom Koenigs from March 2006 to December 2007, Kai Eide from 2008 to 2010, Staffan de Mistura from 2010 to 2011, Ján Kubiš from 2012 to 2014, Nicholas Haysom from 2014 to 2016, Tadamichi Yamamoto from 2016 to 2020, Deborah Lyons from 2020 to 2022 and Roza Otunbayeva from 2022 to 2025.

== Political affairs ==
The Deputy SRSG (political) also has specific responsibility for political affairs: political outreach, conflict resolution, and regional cooperation. Responsibilities include the analysis and reporting, political affairs, Women, Peace and Security, rule of law and a liaison office in Islamabad.

== Development and Humanitarian Assistance ==
UNAMA's Deputy SRSG (Humanitarian) manages UN support for development efforts in Afghanistan, including capacity building and coordination of humanitarian assistance from international bodies. The post holder also serves as UN Resident Coordinator for Afghanistan, responsible for the coordination of the work of the UN Country Team.

The UNCT in Afghanistan comprises 20 agencies, funds and programmes with offices in Afghanistan.

== See also ==
- United Nations Security Council Resolution 1267
- List of UN Security Council Resolutions
- Bonn Agreement
