= United Nations Security Council Resolution 1719 =

UN Security Council Resolution 1719
- Burundi
- Date: 25 October 2006
- Meeting no.: 5,554
- Code: S/RES/1719 (Document)
- Subject: The situation in Burundi
- Voting summary: 15 voted for; None voted against; None abstained
- Result: Adopted

Security Council composition
- Permanent members: China; France; Russia; United Kingdom; United States
- Non-permanent members: Argentina; Rep. of the Congo; Denmark; Ghana; Greece; Japan; Peru; Qatar; Slovakia; Tanzania

United Nations Security Council Resolution 1719, adopted unanimously on October 25, 2006, after recalling resolutions on the situation in Burundi, including resolutions 1545 (2004), 1577 (2004), 1602 (2005), 1606 (2005), 1650 (2005) and 1692 (2006), the Council established the United Nations Integrated Office in Burundi (BINUB) for an initial period of one year to assist in the country's long-term peace and stability.

== Resolution ==
=== Observations ===
The Council welcomed the signing of a ceasefire agreement between the Burundian government and the Palipehutu on September 7, 2006, and paid tribute to Tanzania, South Africa and Uganda for their efforts in the Burundian peace process. There was concern at reports of an impending military coup and the arrest of several political figures. All political parties in the country were asked to maintain dialogue.

The Burundian authorities were called to promote good governance and tackle corruption.

=== Acts ===
Resolution 1719 requested the Secretary-General Kofi Annan to establish BINUB from January 1, 2007 for an initial period of twelve months. It was asked to focus on the following: peace consolidation and democratic governance; disarmament, demobilisation and reintegration and security sector reform; ending impunity and promoting and protecting human rights; strengthening co-operation with donors; and taking account of gender considerations. It was also important that BINUB co-operated with the United Nations Organisation Mission in the Democratic Republic of the Congo (MONUC).

The Council reiterated the primary responsibility of the Burundian authorities for the long-term peace and stability of the country, and for peacebuilding. The government was also urged to pursue reforms and establish mechanisms referred to in Resolution 1606.

Meanwhile, the Council expressed concern over human rights violations in Burundi and urged to authorities to investigate such reports. Both the government and Palipehutu were called upon to implement their ceasefire agreement.

Finally, the Secretary-General had to keep the Councilinformed on developments.

== See also ==
- Burundi Civil War
- List of United Nations Security Council Resolutions 1701 to 1800 (2006–2008)
