= United Nations Security Council Resolution 1834 =

UN Security Council Resolution 1834
- Date: 24 September 2008
- Meeting no.: 5,981
- Code: S/RES/1834 (Document)
- Subject: The situation in Chad, the Central African Republic and the subregion
- Voting summary: 15 voted for; None voted against; None abstained
- Result: Adopted

Security Council composition
- Permanent members: China; France; Russia; United Kingdom; United States
- Non-permanent members: Burkina Faso; Belgium; Costa Rica; Croatia; Indonesia; Italy; Libya; Panama; South Africa; Vietnam

UN Security Council Resolution 1834 was adopted unanimously by the 15 member states of the United Nations Security Council, extending the United Nations mission in Chad and the Central African Republic (MINURCAT) until March 15, 2009, which was due to expire on September 25, 2008.

== Background ==
The United Nations mission in Chad and the Central African Republic, MINURCAT(United Nations Mission in the Central African Republic and Chad), was established in the United Nations Security Council Resolution 1778 on September 25, 2007, which would leave a multidimensional force in Chad and the Central African Republic (CAR) to help create security conductive to a voluntary and sustainable return of Refugees. The mission was created due to an estimated 230,000 refugees fleeing Darfur into eastern Chad and north-eastern CAR. Continued cross border assaults from Sudanese rebels have endangered refugees and local residents alike. The same resolution also authorized a European Union military deployment to support MINURCAT’s activities for one year, acting under Chapter VII of the United Nations Charter.

Before the vote, the Security Council held several meetings to discuss the resolution that would extend the United Nations mission in the region and have the United Nations take over the European Union led military force (EUFOR).

== 5981st Security Council meeting ==
The 15 members of the United Nations Security Council convened at the United Nations headquarters in New York City on September 24, 2008 to discuss extending the mandate on the mission to Chad and the Central African Republic, which was due to expire the next day. The meeting was called to order at 3:15 PM, with the President of the Security Council, Michel Kafando of Burkina Faso, introducing Ahmad Allam-Mi the representative of Chad who had been invited to sit in on the meeting. Members were given document S/2008/616, which contained the text of a draft resolution submitted by Belgium, Costa Rica, Croatia, France, the Libyan Arab Jamahiriya and the United States of America. Members of the Council also were given document S/2008/601 and Addendum 1, which contained the report of the Secretary-General on the United Nations Mission on the Central African Republic and Chad.

The United Kingdom representative Sir John Sawers expressed their support for the resolution, though listed a few concerns. "But there is much work to be done before the Council can take a firm decision on a new peacekeeping mission," he said. "An expanded United Nations mission in Chad needs clear objectives, an achievable mandate, a sensible time frame for deployment, measurable benchmarks and a realistic end state that, once achieved, will enable the force to withdraw. We also question whether a force twice the size of EUFOR is needed." He also expressed reservation over a military presence in the Central African Republic, seeing no value to it, as well as calling for a 'disciplined and strategic approach to the management of scarce peacekeeping resources.'

The proceeding vote on the draft for the Resolution found all 15 members in favor, leading to the adoption of the draft resolution as Resolution 1834.

-	Country	Vote	Representative
(Belgium)	Belgium	Yes	Jan Grauls
(Burkina Faso)	Burkina Faso	Yes	Michel Kafando
(China)	People's Republic of China	Yes	Wang Guangya
(Costa Rica)	Costa Rica	Yes	Jorge Urbina
(Croatia)	Croatia	Yes	Neven Jurica
(France)	France	Yes	Jean-Maurice Ripert
(Indonesia)	Indonesia	Yes	Marty Natalegawa
(Italy)	Italy	Yes	Marcello Spatafora
(Libya)	Libya	Yes	Jadallah Azzuz at-Talhi
(Panama)	Panama	Yes	Ricardo Alberto Arias
(Russia)	Russia	Yes	Vitaly Churkin
(South Africa)	South Africa	Yes	Dumisani Kumalo
(United Kingdom)	United Kingdom	Yes	John Sawers
(United States)	United States	Yes	Zalmay Khalilzad
(Vietnam)	Vietnam	Yes	Lê Lương Minh
