= José Victor da Silva Ângelo =

Portuguese diplomat

José Victor da Silva Angelo (born 1949, Portugal) formerly served as the Special Representative and Head of the United Nations Mission in the Central African Republic and Chad (MINURCAT). He was appointed to the position by UN Secretary-General Ban Ki-moon on 31 January 2008.

Ângelo obtained a master's degree in sociology from Instituto Superior Económico e Social of the University of Évora, Portugal and studied for a Doctor of Philosophy in sociology at l’Université libre de Bruxelles, Belgium.

He started his career as a university lecturer and served as Senior Statistician in the Portuguese National Institute of Statistics (INE). He was a member of the Electoral Commission of Portugal.

Later on, he joined the United Nations, where he served in various capacities, including United Nations Development Programme (UNDP) Special Envoy for East Timor and Asia, Deputy Regional Director for Africa at UNDP in New York, Resident Coordinator/Resident Representative in the United Republic of Tanzania and the Gambia, and Deputy Resident Representative in the Central African Republic. He also served as United Nations Population Fund (UNFPA) Representative in Mozambique and United Nations Adviser in São Tomé and Príncipe.

His extensive experience brought him to serve on more senior positions at the United Nations. From 2000 to 2004, he served as UNDP Resident Representative in Zimbabwe. From 2005 to 2007, he was the Executive Representative of the Secretary-General for Sierra Leone, as well as the Resident Coordinator of the United Nations System in Freetown.

He is married and has two daughters.
