= Sustainable Energy for All =

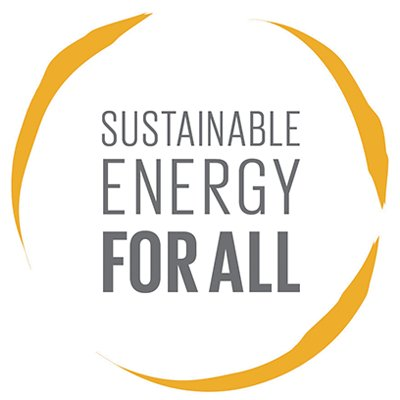
- Abbreviation: SEforALL
- Formation: 2011; 15 years ago as UN Sustainable Energy for All initiative Founded in October 2016 (as Sustainable Energy for All)
- Type: International organization
- Headquarters: Vienna, Austria
- CEO, Special Representative of the UN Secretary-General for Sustainable Energy for All and Co-Chair of UN-Energy: Damilola Ogunbiyi
- Website: www.seforall.org

Sustainable Energy for All (SEforALL) is an international organization working in partnership with the United Nations, leaders in government, the private sector, financial institutions and civil society with as goal to drive further, faster action toward the achievement of Sustainable Development Goal 7, which calls for universal access to sustainable energy by 2030, and the Paris Agreement, which calls for reducing greenhouse gas emissions to limit climate warming to below 2 °C.

Launched by former UN Secretary-General Ban Ki-moon in 2011, SEforALL is now an independent organization based in Vienna, Austria with a satellite office in Washington, DC.

Damilola Ogunbiyi took office in January 2020 as CEO and as Special Representative of the UN Secretary-General for Sustainable Energy for All as well as Co-Chair of UN-Energy. She is the former Managing Director of Nigeria's Rural Electrification Agency.

== See also ==
- Global warming
- Renewable energy
- Sustainable Development Goals
