= MINUGUA =

United Nations Verification Mission in Guatemala
- Abbreviation: MINUGUA
- Formation: 20 January 1997
- Dissolved: 27 May 1997
- Type: Mission
- Legal status: Completed
- Head: Jean Arnault
- Parent organization: United Nations Security Council
- Website: https://www.un.org/Depts/dpko/dpko/co_mission/minugua.htm

MINUGUA (United Nations Verification Mission in Guatemala) was a United Nations humanitarian mission in Guatemala that involved, at the most critical point in the peace process, a three-month peacekeeping mission.

The original name of this operation was United Nations Mission for the Verification of Human Rights and of Compliance with the Comprehensive Agreement on Human Rights in Guatemala. It was changed to United Nations Verification Mission in Guatemala when peacekeepers were deployed.

The aim of the operation was to conclude the 36-year Civil War which had ravaged the country. It was the international community's response to the decision by both government and guerrillas to return to the negotiating table in 1994 and the subsequent signing of the Comprehensive Agreement on Human Rights on 29 March 1994, one of several documents adopted in the run-up to the final peace agreement.

In 1994, the Government of Guatemala and the Unidad Revolucionaria Nacional Guatemalteca (URNG) agreed to resume negotiations to end the longest conflict in Latin America. In September 1994, the General Assembly decided to establish a Human Rights Verification Mission in Guatemala acting on a recommendation by the Secretary-General that such a mission could make a contribution to a persisting pattern of human rights abuse. A series of agreements had earlier been concluded covering a wide range of problems in Guatemalan society:

- Comprehensive Agreement on Human Rights (March 1994)
- Agreement on a Timetable for the Negotiation of a Firm and Lasting Peace (March 1994)
- Agreement on Resettlement of the Population Groups Uprooted by the Armed Conflict (June 1994)
- Agreement on the Establishment of the Commission to Clarify Past Human Rights Violations and Acts of Violence (June 1994)

Since November 1994, MINUGUA carried out verification activities and institution-building throughout the country. More than 250 human rights monitors, legal experts, indigenous specialists and police were posted throughout Guatemala, including in its remotest areas. Their presence and verification activities have focused public attention on human rights and the related problem of impunity, reinforcing the declining trend in political violence.

In 1996, measures aimed at democratic change were consolidated. They included a broad appeal for participation in presidential elections and the unilateral cessation of hostilities by the URNG during the two rounds of elections, the URNG's offer to cease offensive military action in March, followed by a similar commitment from the Government. The year 1996 also saw the conclusion of agreements on Social and Economic Aspects and Agrarian Situation (May 1996) and the Strengthening of Civilian Power and the Role of the Army (September 1996). An earlier agreement covered the identity and rights of indigenous persons (March 1995). In December 1996, the Guatemalan Government and the URNG reached an agreement on the details of a cease-fire, on constitutional and electoral reforms, and the reintegration of the URNG into Guatemala's political life, which was followed by a final peace accord, the Agreement on a Firm and Lasting Peace, signed on 29 December 1996. MINUGUA had already been involved in verification of the Comprehensive Agreement on Human Rights and the human rights aspects of the Agreement on Identity and Rights of Indigenous Peoples. Upon conclusion of the Agreement on a Firm and Lasting Peace, all other agreements entered into force.

By adopting resolution 1094 (1997) on efforts towards peace in Central America, the Security Council authorized on 20 January 1997 the attachment of a group of 155 military observers and requisite medical personnel to MINUGUA for a three-month period, operational as of 3 March 1997. The task of the observer group were verification of the agreement on the definitive ceasefire. While retaining its acronym MINUGUA, the peacekeeping mission's name was changed to United Nations Verification Mission in Guatemala as of 1 April 1997 in order to reflect the new mandate. In a Presidential Statement of 5 March 1997 (S/PRST/1997/9), the Council welcomed the deployment on 3 March 1997 of the group of United Nations military observers attached to the United Nations Mission for the Verification of Human Rights and of Compliance with the Commitments of the Comprehensive Agreement on Human Rights in Guatemala (MINUGUA) for the purposes of verification of the Oslo ceasefire agreement and reaffirmed its full support for the peace process in Guatemala.

The Secretary-General reported to the Security Council on 4 June 1997 on the group of military observers attached to MINUGUA (S/1997/432), stating that of the 155 authorized personnel, 132 military observers from Argentina, Australia, Brazil, Canada, Ecuador, Norway, the Russian Federation, Spain, Sweden, Ukraine, the United States of America, Uruguay and Venezuela were deployed to the Mission area. In addition, 13 medical personnel from Austria, Germany and Singapore served in the mission.

The 1996 Oslo Agreement provided for the formal ceasefire to enter into force as of 00:00 hours on D-day, on which date the United Nations military observer group as the verification authority was ready to assume its responsibilities. On 13 February 1997, the Secretary-General informed the Security Council (S/1997/123) that the operation it had mandated could begin on 3 March 1997, following completion of the preparatory work for the deployment of the group and the establishment of the URNG assembly points. Until then, the parties maintained the informal ceasefire that they had observed since 19 March 1996. On day D-15 (16 February 1997), URNG provided information on 3,570 personnel to be demobilized. It also provided an inventory of the weapons, explosives and mines in its possession and information on the location of remaining minefields. The Guatemalan Army, for its part, provided the requisite list of units that were to be redeployed to their bases. On D-10 (21 February 1997), members of the military observer group were deployed to the six verification centres (Finca Sacol, Finca Claudia, Finca Las Abejas, Tululché, Tzalbal and Mayalán) responsible for monitoring the eight URNG assembly points. In addition, two sector headquarters and a main headquarters were set up to provide command and control.

The separation of forces between the Guatemalan Army and URNG was carried out through the establishment of two concentric areas around each URNG assembly point. Army units were not permitted to enter an inner 6-kilometre-wide "security zone" and police units could only do so after coordinating their movements with the military observer group. As Army units left the security zones, URNG troops moved to the assembly points according to a plan presented to the military observer group on D+2 (5 March 1997). As envisaged by the Agreement, two United Nations military observers were attached to each of the Guatemalan Army units subject to verification. As former combatants concentrated in the assembly points, their weapons, munitions, explosives, mines and related military equipment were registered and handed over to the United Nations military observers for storage in special containers and explosive dumps.

Although demining was not foreseen in the Agreement, URNG helped to identify and clear all its minefields, in particular that located on the Tajumulco Volcan. By 18 April 1997, 378 mines and explosive devices had been lifted and destroyed. 2,928 URNG rebels were demobilized, and a total of 535,102 weapons and rounds of ammunition were handed over to the United Nations military observer group by URNG. On 14 May 1997, URNG weapons, munitions and equipment, as well as the lists of destroyed explosive devices, were delivered to the Ministry of the Interior of Guatemala. The corresponding handover certificate was signed by the Government of Guatemala, and by the UN Chief Military Observer This last act signalled the completion of the mandate of the military observer group. Repatriation of the members of the United Nations military observer group began on 17 May 1997. A rear party remained at headquarters in the capital until 27 May, when the last United Nations military observers departed Guatemala.
