= United Nations Security Council Resolution 1861 =

UN Security Council Resolution 1861
- Date: 14 January 2009
- Meeting no.: 6,064
- Code: S/RES/1861 (Document)
- Subject: The situation in Chad, the Central African Republic and the subregion
- Voting summary: 15 voted for; None voted against; None abstained
- Result: Adopted

Security Council composition
- Permanent members: China; France; Russia; United Kingdom; United States
- Non-permanent members: Austria; Burkina Faso; Costa Rica; Croatia; Japan; Libya; Mexico; Turkey; Uganda; Vietnam

United Nations Security Council Resolution 1861 was unanimously adopted on 14 January 2009.

== Resolution ==
The Security Council today extended the mandate of the United Nations Mission in the Central African Republic and Chad (MINURCAT), to expire on 15 March 2009, until 15 March 2010, at the same time giving it a military component to follow up the European Union force that had been deployed to the region.

MINURCAT had been established on 25 September 2007 by resolution 1778 (see Press Release SC/9127) as part of a “multidimensional presence” in eastern Chad and the north-eastern Central African Republic to support elements of the Chadian police and liaise with other actors in the region to assist refugees and to counter threats to humanitarian activities.

The multidimensional presence was intended to help create the security conditions conducive to a voluntary, secure and sustainable return of refugees and displaced persons, including through the protection of those refugees, displaced persons and civilians in danger. It was also aimed at helping monitor the human rights situation in the region and work with the Governments and civil society of Chad and the Central African Republic to promote human rights standards and to end the recruitment and use of child soldiers. A European Union-led military force, EUFOR, was authorized to take “all necessary measures” to protect civilians in danger, to facilitate delivery of humanitarian aid and to help provide United Nations personnel with protection and freedom of movement.

Unanimously adopting resolution 1861 (2009), the Council decided that MINURCAT shall include a maximum of 300 police officers, 25 military liaison officers, 5,200 military personnel, and an appropriate number of civilian personnel to carry out its former tasks.

Under Chapter VII of the United Nations Charter, MINURCAT was also mandated to continue the tasks of EUFOR, whose mandate was to expire on 15 March 2009, regarding protection of civilians in danger, facilitation of delivery of humanitarian aid, and protection of United Nations personnel and facilities. The Council encouraged the Governments of Chad and the Central African Republic to continue to cooperate with the United Nations and the European Union to facilitate the smooth transition from EUFOR to the United Nations military component, including the hand-over of all sites and infrastructure established by EUFOR to the United Nations.

By the text, MINURCAT will also establish a permanent military presence in Birao, Central African Republic, which is authorized to take all necessary measures, in liaison with the country’s Government, to contribute to a more secure environment; execute operations of a limited character in order to extract civilians and humanitarian workers in danger; and to protect United Nations personnel and facilities and to ensure the security and freedom of movement of United Nations staff and associated personnel.

== See also ==
- List of United Nations Security Council Resolutions 1801 to 1900 (2008–2009)
