= United Nations Security Council Resolution 1791 =

UN Security Council Resolution 1791
- Date: 19 December 2007
- Meeting no.: 5,809
- Code: S/RES/1791 (Document)
- Subject: The situation in Burundi
- Voting summary: 15 voted for; None voted against; None abstained
- Result: Adopted

Security Council composition
- Permanent members: China; France; Russia; United Kingdom; United States
- Non-permanent members: Belgium; Rep. of the Congo; Ghana; Indonesia; Italy; Panama; Peru; Qatar; Slovakia; South Africa

United Nations Security Council Resolution 1791 was unanimously adopted on 19 December 2007.

== Resolution ==
Welcoming the appointment on 14 November of a Government of National Unity in Burundi and emphasizing the need for the United Nations system and the international community to maintain their support for peace consolidation and long-term development in that country, the Security Council today extended the mandate of the United Nations Integrated Office in Burundi (BINUB) until 31 December 2008.

In the unanimously adopted resolution 1791 (2007), the Council called on the Government of Burundi and the Palipehutu-Forces nationales de libération (FNL) – the two parties to the September 2006 Comprehensive Ceasefire Agreement – to refrain from any action that might lead to a resumption of hostilities and to resolve outstanding issues in a spirit of cooperation.

The Council urged the Palipehutu-FNL to return to the Joint Verification and Monitoring Mechanism, established by that Agreement, without delay or preconditions and to immediately release all children associated with the movement.

BINUB was requested to play a robust political role in support of the peace process, in full coordination with regional and international partners. The Burundian Government was encouraged to pursue its efforts regarding peace consolidation challenges, in particular democratic governance and justice and security reform.

== See also ==
- List of United Nations Security Council Resolutions 1701 to 1800 (2006–2008)
