= United Nations Office in Burundi =

Organization

- Abbreviation: BNUB
- Type: Peace Support Mission
- Head: Parfait Onanga-Anyanga
- Parent organization: United Nations Security Council
- Website: http://bnub.unmissions.org

The United Nations Office in Burundi (BNUB) was established by the United Nations Security Council in December 2010 as a scaled-down operation to replace the United Nations Integrated Office in Burundi from 1 January 2011.

BNUB, established by Resolution 1959 (2010), was authorised to:

1. support the development of national institutions;
2. promote dialogue;
3. combat impunity;
4. promote human rights;
5. ensure economic and financial policies meet the needs of vulnerable people and advocate resource mobilisation for Burundi;
6. support with regional integration issues.

The Security Council gave BNUB an initial twelve month mandate until the end of December 2011, which was extended until February 15, 2013.

The BNUB completed its mandate 31 December 2014, and its responsibilities were transferred to the UN Development Assistance Framework - specifically to the Country Team for Burundi. The UN Electoral Observation Mission in Burundi (MENUB) officially began work on 1 January 2015.

== See also ==
- Burundi Civil War
