= United Nations Security Council Resolution 1778 =

UN Security Council Resolution 1778
- Date: 25 September 2007
- Meeting no.: 5,748
- Code: S/RES/1778 (Document)
- Subject: The situation in Chad, the Central African Republic and the subregion
- Voting summary: 15 voted for; None voted against; None abstained
- Result: Adopted

Security Council composition
- Permanent members: China; France; Russia; United Kingdom; United States
- Non-permanent members: Belgium; Rep. of the Congo; Ghana; Indonesia; Italy; Panama; Peru; Qatar; Slovakia; South Africa

United Nations Security Council Resolution 1778 was unanimously adopted on 25 September 2007.

== Resolution ==
Deeply concerned about the humanitarian threat posed by armed groups on the borders of the Sudan’s troubled Darfur region, the Security Council this morning decided to establish what it called a “multidimensional presence”, in concert with European forces, in eastern Chad and the north-eastern Central African Republic.

According to resolution 1778 (2007), adopted unanimously by the 15-member body, that presence would consist of the new United Nations Mission in the Central African Republic and Chad, to be known as MINURCAT, and troops deployed by the European Union with a robust authorization to protect and support it. Both groups were mandated to operate for an initial period of one year.

MINURCAT, with an initial deployment of 300 police and 50 military liaison officers, would support elements of the Chadian police and liaise with other actors in the region to assist refugees and to counter threats to humanitarian activities, according to the resolution.

The text also stipulates that MINURCAT would help monitor the human rights situation in the region, and work with the Governments and civil society of Chad and the Central African Republic to promote human rights standards and put an end to the recruitment and use of child soldiers. It would also assist both countries in promoting the rule of law, in coordination with other United Nations entities.

The European Union operation, mandated under the binding Chapter VII of the United Nations Charter, was authorized to take “all necessary measures” to help protect civilians in danger, to facilitate delivery of humanitarian aid and to help provide United Nations personnel with protection and freedom of movement.

== See also ==
- List of United Nations Security Council Resolutions 1701 to 1800 (2006–2008)
