= United Nations Security Council Resolution 1858 =

UN Security Council Resolution 1858
- Date: 22 December 2008
- Meeting no.: 6,057
- Code: S/RES/1858 (Document)
- Subject: The situation in Burundi
- Voting summary: 15 voted for; None voted against; None abstained
- Result: Adopted

Security Council composition
- Permanent members: China; France; Russia; United Kingdom; United States
- Non-permanent members: Burkina Faso; Belgium; Costa Rica; Croatia; Indonesia; Italy; Libya; Panama; South Africa; Vietnam

United Nations Security Council Resolution 1858 was unanimously adopted on 22 December 2008.

== Resolution ==
Emphasizing the need for the international community to maintain its support for peace consolidation and long-term development in Burundi, the Security Council today decided to extend the mandate of the United Nations Integrated Office country, known as BINUB, for one year, until 31 December 2009.

Through the unanimous adoption of resolution 1858 (2008), the Council underscored the importance of BINUB's support for elections in 2010, transitional justice and the process of disarmament, demobilization and reintegration for ex-combatants, in coordination with the Government, the United Nations country team and the Peacebuilding Commission, which took on Burundi as one of the first countries in its portfolio.

By the text, the council also urged the Government and the opposition Forces Nationales de Libération (Palipehutu-FNL) to make every effort to implement, before 31 December 2008, the agreements they had reached on 4 December 2008 to bring the last phase of the peace process to a successful conclusion.

Expressing particular concern at continuing gender-based violence in the country, it urged the Government to take the necessary steps to prevent further violations and to ensure that those responsible are brought to justice. It demanded that Palipahutu-FNL and other armed groups release all children associated with them, immediately and unconditionally.

== See also ==
- List of United Nations Security Council Resolutions 1801 to 1900 (2008–2009)
