= United Nations Integrated Office in Burundi =

Organization

- Abbreviation: BINUB
- Formation: 1 January 2007
- Type: Peace Support Mission
- Legal status: Completed (2011)
- Head: Youssef Mahmoud
- Parent organization: United Nations Security Council
- Website: http://bnub.unmissions.org/

The United Nations Integrated Office in Burundi (BINUB) was established by the United Nations Security Council to support the government of Burundi in its efforts towards long-term peace and stability and to replace the work of United Nations Operation in Burundi (ONUB). Its mandate was scheduled to begin on 1 January 2007 for an initial 12 months, and its creation and mission was as a result of recommendations in a report by the secretary-general.

The previous UN mission in Burundi, ONUB, was created to facilitate the implementation of the peace agreements signed between the previous government and the CNDD-FDD rebel group. The CNDD-FDD's leader Pierre Nkurunziza went on to win the Burundian elections in 2005, and his party effectively controls the Burundian government.

The reasons for establishing a second mission in Burundi, following directly on the ONUB missions, was the ceasefire agreement reached between the new CNDD-FDD government and the last remaining rebel group Palipehutu-FNL. This ceasefire agreement was signed on 7 September 2006 in Dar es Salaam, Tanzania, after mediation by South Africa in talks that began in May. Among the key points in the agreement were a complete cessation of hostilities, temporary immunity for FNL fighters and the demobilization of these troops and their subsequent integration into the armed forces of Burundi, in line with earlier peace agreements in this conflict that all stipulated power-sharing arrangements in the security sector.

The BINUB mission was created to facilitate the implementation of this ceasefire agreement, with the most important point of the mandate being the support of the implementation of the modalities of the agreement, assistance in the reform of the security sector and support of the reintegration of ex-combatants. The Burundian government also requested the BINUB to help in the establishment of rule of law, good governance and freedom of press and media.

The mandate of BINUB currently extends to the end of 2010.

It was replaced by the United Nations Office in Burundi (BNUB) on 1 January 2011.
