= United Nations Mission in the Central African Republic and Chad =

UN peacekeeping mission established 2007

- Chad (green), Central African Republic (blue) and Sudan (orange)
- Abbreviation: MINURCAT
- Formation: 25 September 2007
- Type: Peacekeeping Mission
- Legal status: Inactive (mandate until 31 December 2010)
- Head: José Victor da Silva Angelo
- Parent organization: United Nations Security Council
- Website: minurcat.unmissions.org

The United Nations Mission in the Central African Republic and Chad (MINURCAT) was a United Nations peacekeeping mission established by the United Nations Security Council on September 25, 2007 to provide a multidimensional presence of up to 350 police and military personnel to eastern Chad and north-eastern Central African Republic

The mission comes as a response to the dire situation of an estimated 230,000 refugees from Darfur who continue to flee into bordering eastern Chad and north-eastern Central African Republic (CAR). Armed Sudanese rebel groups have continuously carried out attacks across the Sudanese border, endangering local residents and Darfurian refugees alike.

This followed on from a resolution in July 2007 sending UNAMID into the region and a resolution in August 2006 sending UNMIS there, the Secretary-General drafted a report outlining the shape of the mission he thought should be sent there, as well as received assurance from the European Union of its contribution of troops.

Although the EUFOR Tchad/RCA was originally scheduled to deploy in November 2007, it was delayed until February by a lack of equipment. It reached its Initial Operational Capability on 15 March 2008 and was replaced by UN forces under the same MINURCAT mandate on 15 March 2009. The latest resolution to concern the MINURCAT mandate, Security Council Resolution 1913, extended the stationing of the mission until 15 May 2010 allowing further discussions with the Chadian government which asked for the mandate not be renewed. A further extension was done until the end of 2010.

MINURCAT's mandate officially ended on December 31, 2010.

== Strength ==
=== Military personnel ===
As of 2010, there were 5,200 military personnel and 27 military liaison officers from Algeria, Bangladesh, Benin, Burkina Faso, Democratic Republic of the Congo, Denmark, Egypt, Ethiopia, Ghana, Ireland, Kenya, Mali, Mongolia, Namibia, Nepal, Nigeria, Norway, Pakistan, Poland, Russia, Rwanda, Senegal, Serbia, Sri Lanka, Togo, Tunisia and United States.

=== Police personnel ===
As of 2010, there were 300 police officers from Benin, Burkina Faso, Cameroon, Côte d'Ivoire, Egypt, Finland, France, Guinea, Jordan, Madagascar, Mali, Niger, Oman, Rwanda, Senegal, Turkey and Yemen.

== European Union mission ==
The EU forces mission EUFOR Tchad/RCA operated under the auspices and in the framework of MINURCAT in Chad and the Central African Republic as authorized in late 2007. The deployment of up to 3,700 troops began in February 2008. Contributors included (with number of troops committed):

- Albania – three contingents consisting of 63 military members (189 in total)
- France – half of the full contingent
- (Republic of Ireland) Ireland – 411 troops
- Poland – 350 troops
- Sweden – 200 troops
- Austria – 160 troops
- Romania – 120 troops
- Belgium – 100 troops
- Spain – 80 troops
- Finland – 40 troops
- Netherlands – 60 Marines

According to the Brussels-based news agency “Panapress”, a number of non-EU countries also expressed interest in providing logistic or personnel support to the EUFOR mission.

Their mandate included “to take all necessary measures, within its capabilities and its area of operation in eastern Chad and the north-eastern Central African Republic” to protect civilians, facilitate delivery of humanitarian aid, and ensure the safety of UN personnel. The EU operation commander, General Patrick Nash, announced on 5 November that this force will be 3,700 troops strong. The military operation was approved by the Council of the European Union on 15 October.
