= United Nations Security Council Resolution 2110 =

UN Security Council Resolution 2110
- Map of Iraq (green).
- Date: 24 July 2013
- Meeting no.: 7,008
- Code: S/RES/2110 (Document)
- Subject: The United Nations Assistance Mission for Iraq (UNAMI)
- Voting summary: 15 voted for; None voted against; None abstained
- Result: Unanimously Adopted

Security Council composition
- Permanent members: China; France; Russia; United Kingdom; United States
- Non-permanent members: Argentina; Australia; Azerbaijan; Guatemala; South Korea; Luxembourg; Morocco; Pakistan; Rwanda; Togo

United Nations Security Council Resolution 2110 is a United Nations Security Council resolution adopted unanimously by the United Nations Security Council on 24 July 2013, extending the United Nations Assistance Mission for Iraq until 31 July 2014 as stipulated in several previous resolutions (Resolution 1550 (2003), Resolution 1546 (2004), Resolution 1557 (2004), Resolution 1619 (2005), Resolution 1700 (2006), Resolution 1770 (2007), Resolution 1830 (2008), Resolution 1883 (2009), Resolution 1936 (2010), Resolution 2001 (2011), Resolution 2061 (2012) and Resolution 2107 (2013).) The resolution signaled its intention to review the original mandate, as stipulated in UNSC resolution 2061 within twelve months.

The resolution also goes on to emphasize the need for the Iraqi government to continue to provide security and logistical support for the United Nations personnel, declaring the "essential" for the UNAMI.
