= United Nations Security Council Resolution 2001 =

UN Security Council Resolution 2001
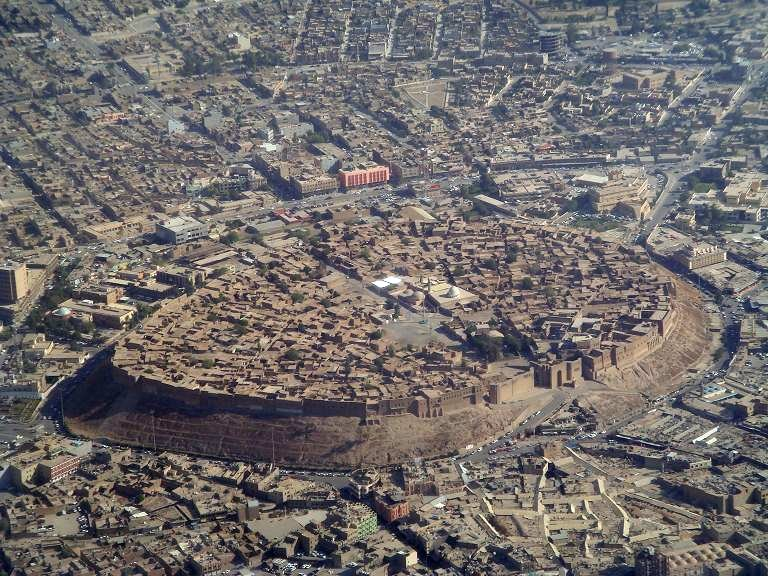
- Citadel of Arbil in Iraq
- Date: 28 July 2011
- Meeting no.: 6,594
- Code: S/RES/2001 (Document)
- Subject: The situation in Iraq
- Voting summary: 15 voted for; None voted against; None abstained
- Result: Adopted

Security Council composition
- Permanent members: China; France; Russia; United Kingdom; United States
- Non-permanent members: Bosnia–Herzegovina; Brazil; Colombia; Germany; Gabon; India; Lebanon; Nigeria; Portugal; South Africa

United Nations Security Council Resolution 2001, adopted unanimously on July 28, 2011, after recalling all previous resolutions on the situation in Iraq, including resolutions 1500 (2003), 1546 (2004), 1557 (2004), 1619 (2005), 1700 (2006), 1770 (2007), 1830 (2008), 1883 (2009) and 1936 (2010), the Council extended the mandate of the United Nations Assistance Mission in Iraq (UNAMI) for a further period of 1 year.

The resolution was drafted by the United States.

== Resolution ==
=== Observations ===
In the preamble of the resolution, the Security Council emphasised the importance of stability and security of Iraq and its people, the region and international community. The Iraqi government was urged to continue to strengthen democracy and the rule of law and improvements in the security situation in the country were welcomed, though the Council noted that challenges remained. It underlined the need for an inclusive political process and the role of the United Nations.

Greater efforts were urged with regard to promoting the human rights and humanitarian issues of the Iraqi people. The Council reaffirmed that all parties should take steps to protect civilians and create conditions for the return of refugees and internally displaced persons.

The preamble concluded by welcoming progress made towards Iraq achieving an international standing to that prior to the adoption of Resolution 661 (1990), further calling on Iraq to continue dialogue with Kuwait to resolve issues from previously issued Chapter VII resolutions.

=== Acts ===
The mandate of UNAMI and the Special Representative was extended for one year and would be reviewed at the end of that period or sooner if requested to do so by the Iraqi government. The security of UNAMI personnel was emphasised in order for the operation to carry out its work and the Iraqi government and other countries were called upon to provide support to the United Nations in the country. The Council appreciated the efforts of countries that had provided financial, logistical, and security resources to UNAMI.

Finally, Resolution 2001 concluded by requesting the Secretary-General Ban Ki-moon to report every four months on progress made by UNAMI in fulfilling its responsibilities.

== See also ==
- Iraq War
- List of United Nations Security Council Resolutions 2001 to 2100 (2011 – present)
- Post-invasion Iraq
