= United Nations Security Council Resolution 1936 =

UN Security Council Resolution 1936
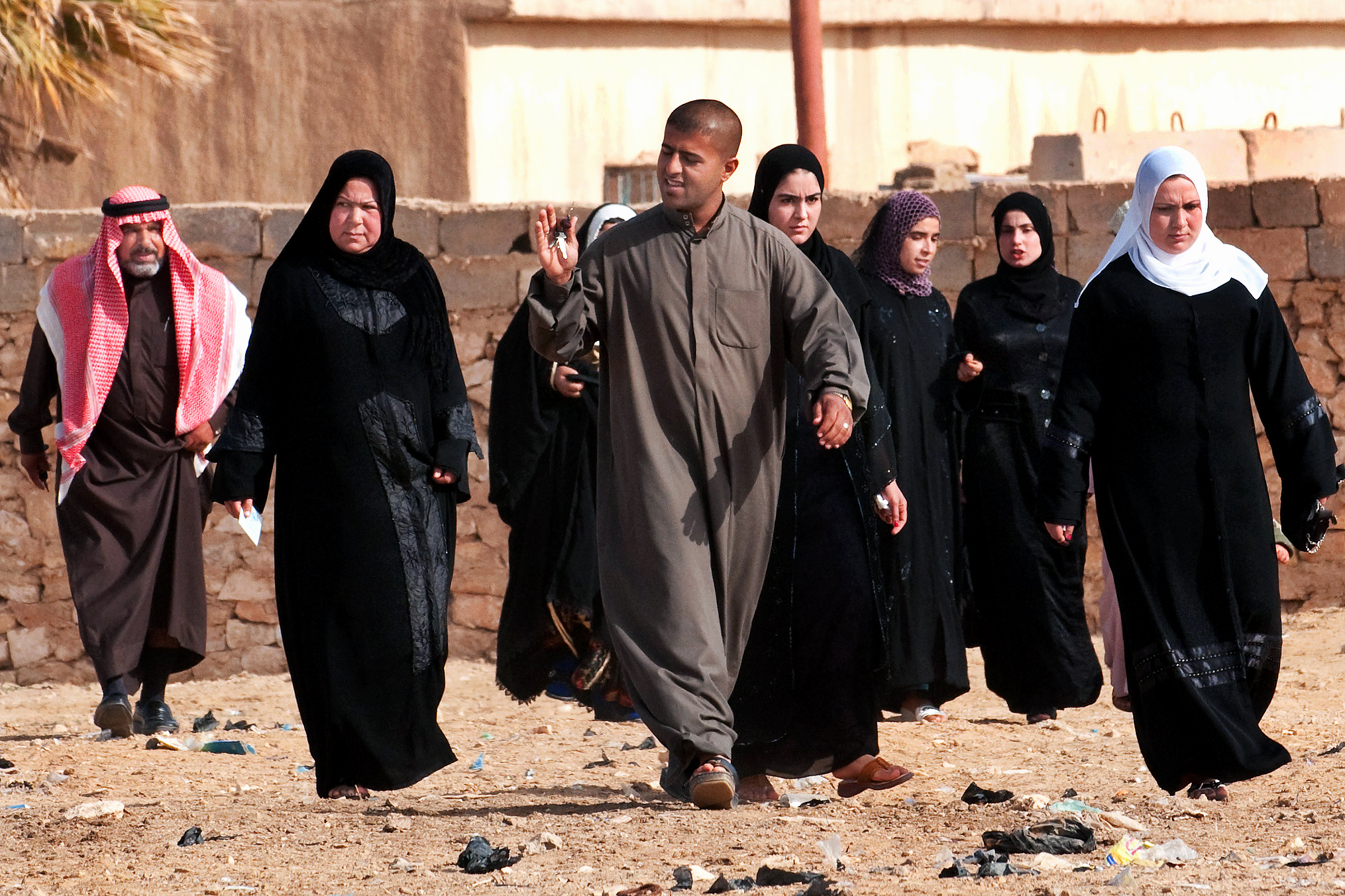
- Iraqi citizens after voting in the 2010 elections
- Date: 5 August 2010
- Meeting no.: 6,369
- Code: S/RES/1936 (Document)
- Subject: The situation in Iraq
- Voting summary: 15 voted for; None voted against; None abstained
- Result: Adopted

Security Council composition
- Permanent members: China; France; Russia; United Kingdom; United States
- Non-permanent members: Austria; Bosnia–Herzegovina; Brazil; Gabon; Japan; Lebanon; Mexico; Nigeria; Turkey; Uganda

United Nations Security Council Resolution 1936, adopted unanimously on August 5, 2010, after recalling all previous resolutions on the situation in Iraq, including resolutions 1500 (2003), 1546 (2004), 1557 (2004), 1619 (2005), 1700 (2006), 1770 (2007), 1830 (2008) and 1883 (2009), the Council extended the mandate of the United Nations Assistance Mission in Iraq (UNAMI) for a further period of 12 months, until July 31, 2011.

The resolution was sponsored by Japan, Turkey, the United Kingdom and the United States.

== Resolution ==
=== Observations ===
In the preamble of the resolution, the Security Council emphasised the importance of stability and security of Iraq and its people, the region and international community. The Iraqi government was urged to continue to strengthen democracy and the rule of law and improvements in the security situation in the country were welcomed, though the Council noted that challenges remained. It underlined the need for an inclusive political process and the role of the United Nations.

The Council further welcomed the March 7, 2010 parliamentary election and called for an inclusive government to be formed as soon as possible. The Secretary-General's report had expressed concern at the delay in forming a new government. Greater efforts were urged with regard to human rights and humanitarian issues of the Iraqi people. It reaffirmed that all parties should take steps to protect civilians and create conditions for the return of refugees and internally displaced persons.

The preamble concluded by thanking Ad Melkert, the Special Representative of the Secretary-General, for his leadership of UNAMI and recognised the importance of Iraq achieving an international standing to that prior to the adoption of Resolution 661 (1990).

=== Acts ===
The mandate of UNAMI and the Special Representative was extended for one year and would be reviewed at the end of that period or soon if requested to do so by the Iraqi government. The security of UNAMI personnel was emphasised in order for the operation to carry out its work and the Iraqi government and other countries were called upon to provide support to the United Nations in the country. The Council appreciated the efforts of countries that had provided financial, logistical, and security resources to UNAMI.

Finally, the Resolution 1936 concluded by requesting the Secretary-General Ban Ki-moon to report every four months on progress made by UNAMI in fulfilling its responsibilities.

== See also ==
- Iraq War
- List of United Nations Security Council Resolutions 1901 to 2000 (2009–2011)
- Post-invasion Iraq
