= International sanctions against Iraq =

Comprehensive economic blockade

Legal timeline
- Established: 6 August 1990 (UN Resolution 661)
- Mostly lifted: 22 May 2003 (UN Resolution 1483)
- Fully concluded: 22 February 2022 (UN Resolution 2621)

Strategic background
- Immediate cause: Iraqi invasion of Kuwait (August 1990)
- Motives: Force Iraqi military withdrawal from Kuwait; Complete disarmament of WMD programs; Secure financial reparations for war damage

Humanitarian impact
- Economic toll: Contributed to collapse of Iraq's GDP per capita national income; complete isolation from international commercial markets.
- Human toll: Contributed to increased rates of malnutrition, shortages of medical supplies, diseases from lack of clean water, lengthy power outages, and the near collapse of the education system.; Excess mortality: Disputed

On 6 August 1990, four days after the Iraqi invasion of Kuwait, the United Nations Security Council (UNSC) placed a comprehensive embargo on Iraq. The sanctions stayed largely in force until 22 May 2003 (after Saddam Hussein being forced from power), and persisted in part, including reparations to Kuwait. The original stated purposes of the sanctions were to compel Iraq to withdraw from Kuwait, to pay reparations, and to disclose and eliminate any weapons of mass destruction (WMD).

The UNSC imposed stringent economic sanctions on Iraq by adopting and enforcing United Nations Security Council Resolution 661 in August 1990. Resolution 661 banned all trade and financial resources with both Iraq and occupied Kuwait except for medicine and "in humanitarian circumstances" foodstuffs, the import of which was tightly regulated. In April 1991, following Iraq's defeat in the Gulf War, Resolution 687 lifted the prohibition on foodstuffs, but sanctions remained in effect with revisions, including linkage to removal of weapons of mass destruction.

Despite the provisions of Resolution 706, Resolution 712, and Resolution 986, the UN and the Iraqi government could not agree on the terms of an Oil-for-Food Programme (OFFP), which effectively barred Iraqi oil from the world market for several years. When a memorandum of understanding was finally reached in 1996, the resulting OFFP allowed Iraq to resume oil exports in controlled quantities, but the funds were held in escrow and the majority of Iraq's purchases had to be individually approved by the "Iraq Sanctions Committee," composed of the fifteen members of the UNSC. (Additionally, some funds were withheld for Kuwaiti reparations.) The sanctions regime was continually modified in response to growing international concern over civilian harms attributed to the sanctions; eventually, all limitations on the quantity of Iraqi oil exports were removed (per Resolution 1284), and a large proportion of Iraqi purchases were pre-approved (per Resolution 1409), with the exception of those involving dual-use technology. In later years, Iraq manipulated the OFFP to generate hard currency for illegal transactions, while some neighboring countries began to ignore the sanctions entirely, contributing to a modest economic recovery. By reducing food imports, the sanctions appear to have played a role in encouraging Iraq to become more agriculturally self-sufficient, although malnutrition among Iraqis was nevertheless reported.

During the 1990s and 2000s, many surveys and studies found child mortality more than doubled during the sanctions, with estimates ranging from 227,000 to 500,000 excess deaths among children under the age of 5. However, the three comprehensive surveys (using full birth histories) conducted with the post-invasion Iraqi government—namely, the 2004 Iraq Living Conditions Survey (ILCS) and the 2006 and 2011 Multiple Indicator Cluster Surveys (MICS) carried out by UNICEF and Iraq's Ministry of Health (MOH)—all found that the child mortality rate in the period 1995–2000 was approximately 40 per 1000, which means that "there was no major rise in child mortality in Iraq after 1990 and during the period of the sanctions." Additionally, a 2017 study in The BMJ hypothesized that some commonly cited survey data may have been manipulated by the former Saddam Hussein regime. Nevertheless, sanctions contributed to a significant reduction in Iraq's per capita national income, high rates of malnutrition, shortages of medical supplies, diseases from lack of clean water, lengthy power outages, and the near collapse of the education system—especially prior to the introduction of the OFFP. Most UNSC sanctions since the 1990s have been targeted rather than comprehensive, a change partially motivated by concerns that the Iraq sanctions had inflicted disproportionate civilian harm.

== Prior calls to sanction Iraq ==
The Reagan administration generally supported Iraq during the Iran–Iraq War, despite Iraq's extensive use of chemical weapons against post-revolutionary Iran. In response to reports of further Iraqi chemical attacks against its Kurdish minority after the end of the war with Iran, in September 1988 United States (U.S.) senators Claiborne Pell and Jesse Helms called for comprehensive economic sanctions against Iraq, including an oil embargo and severe limitations on the export of dual-use technology. Although the ensuing legislation passed in the U.S. Senate, it faced strong opposition within the House of Representatives and did not become law. Several U.S. commercial interests with ties to Iraq lobbied against sanctions, as did the State Department, despite Secretary of State George Shultz's public condemnation of Iraq's "unjustified and abhorrent" chemical attacks. According to Pell in October 1988: "Agricultural interests objected to the suspension of taxpayer subsidies for agricultural exports to Iraq; the oil industry protested the oil boycott—although alternative supplies are readily available. Even a chemical company called to inquire how its products might be impacted."

== Administration ==
As described by the United Nations (UN), the United Nations Security Council (UNSC) Resolution 661 imposed comprehensive sanctions on Iraq following that country's August 1990 invasion of Kuwait. These sanctions included strict limits both on the items that could be imported into Iraq and on those that could be exported. UN Resolutions 660, 661, 662, 664, 665, 666, 667, 669, 670, 674, 677, 678 and 687 expressed the goals of eliminating weapons of mass destruction (WMD) and extended-range ballistic missiles, prohibiting any support for terrorism, and forcing Iraq to pay war reparations and all foreign debt.

=== Limitations on imports ===
When the Oil-for-Food Programme (OFFP) allowed Iraq to resume exporting oil in 1996, the resulting revenue was held in escrow; Iraq had to ask the "Iraq Sanctions Committee" (i.e., the fifteen members of the UNSC) to individually approve its purchases, with "foodstuffs and certain medical, health and agricultural materials exempt from review" according to the United States Department of State. (Additionally, some of the revenue was redirected for other purposes, notably reparations to Kuwait.) In May 2002 the process was streamlined by Resolution 1409, which established a "Goods Review List" for dual-purpose items. From then on, all other Iraqi purchases were automatically approved, while the listed items were reviewed separately.

=== Enforcement of sanctions ===
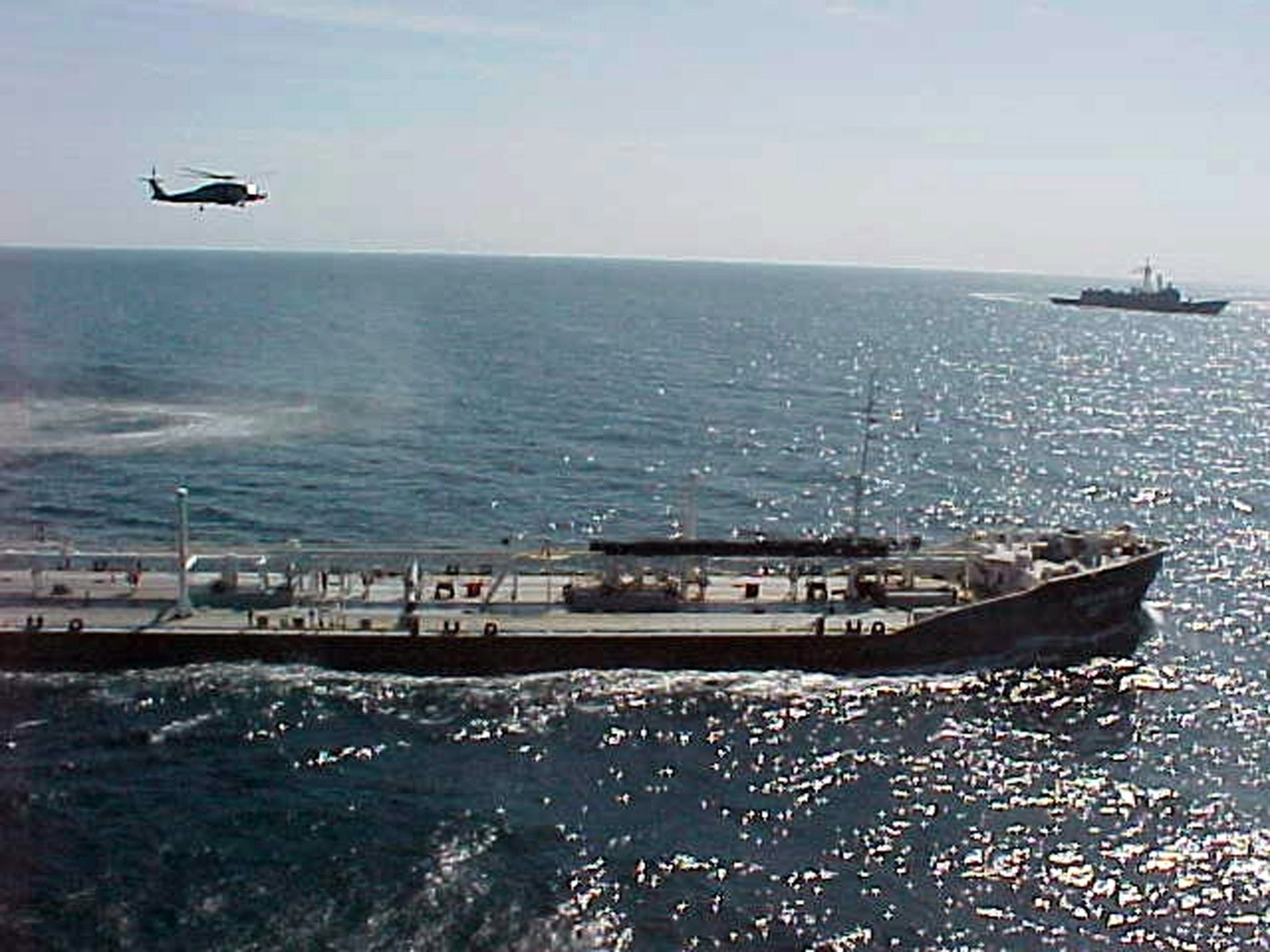
An American helicopter shadows the Russian oil tanker Volgoneft-147

Enforcement of the sanctions was primarily by means of military force and legal sanctions. Following the passage of Security Council Resolution 665, a Multinational Interception Force was organized and led by the U.S. to intercept, inspect and possibly impound vessels, cargoes and crews suspected of carrying freight to or from Iraq.

The legal side of sanctions included enforcement through actions brought by individual governments. In the U.S., legal enforcement was handled by the Office of Foreign Assets Control (OFAC). For example, in 2005 OFAC fined Voices in the Wilderness $20,000 for gifting medicine and other humanitarian supplies to Iraqis without prior acquisition of an export license as required by law.

=== Effectiveness ===
There is a general consensus that the sanctions achieved the express goals of limiting Iraqi arms. For example, U.S. Under Secretary of Defense Douglas J. Feith says that the sanctions diminished Iraq militarily. According to scholars George A. Lopez and David Cortright: "Sanctions compelled Iraq to accept inspections and monitoring and won concessions from Baghdad on political issues such as the border dispute with Kuwait. They also drastically reduced the revenue available to Saddam, prevented the rebuilding of Iraqi defenses after the Persian Gulf War, and blocked the import of vital materials and technologies for producing WMD." Saddam told his Federal Bureau of Investigation (FBI) interrogator that Iraq's armaments "had been eliminated by the UN sanctions."

== Oil-for-Food Programme ==
As the humanitarian impact of the sanctions became a matter of international concern, several UN resolutions were introduced that allowed Iraq to trade its oil for approved goods such as food and medicine. The earliest of these, Resolution 706 of 15 August 1991, allowed the sale of Iraqi oil in exchange for food, which was reaffirmed by Resolution 712 in September 1991. The UN states that "The Government of Iraq declined these offers". As a result, Iraq was effectively barred from exporting oil to the world market for several years.

Iraqi GDP per capita, 1990–2003, per UNDESA
1990	$1,371
1991	$467
1992	$537
1993	$372
1994	$289
1995	$241
1996	$410
1997	$435
1998	$538
1999	$910
2000	$1,006
2001	$1,022
2002	$978
2003	$903

In April 1995, an Oil-for-Food Programme (OFFP) was formally created under Security Council Resolution 986, but the resolution could not be implemented until Iraq signed a memorandum of understanding (MOU) with the UN in May 1996. Under the OFFP, the UN states that "Iraq was permitted to sell $2 billion worth of oil every six months, with two-thirds of that amount to be used to meet Iraq's humanitarian needs. In 1998, the limit on the level of Iraqi oil exports ... was raised to $5.26 billion every six months, again with two-thirds of the oil proceeds to be earmarked to meet the humanitarian needs of the Iraqi people." In later iterations of the OFFP (pursuant to the December 1999 Resolution 1284), there were no restrictions on Iraq's oil exports and the share of revenue allocated to humanitarian relief increased to 72%; 25% of the proceeds (which were held in escrow) were redirected to a Kuwaiti reparations fund, and 3% to UN programs related to Iraq. The first shipments of food arrived in March 1997, with medicines following in May 1997. The UN recounts that "Over the life of the Programme, the Security Council expanded its initial emphasis on food and medicines to include infrastructure rehabilitation". The UN, rather than the Iraqi government, administered the OFFP in Iraq's Kurdistan Region.

While the OFFP is credited with improving the conditions of the population, it was not free from controversy. The U.S. State Department criticized the Iraqi government for inadequately spending the money. In 2004–2005, the OFFP became the subject of major media attention over corruption, as allegations surfaced that Iraq had systematically sold oil vouchers at below-market prices in return for some of the proceeds from the resale outside the scope of the programme; investigations implicated individuals and companies from dozens of countries. In 2005, a UN investigation led by Paul Volcker found that the director of the OFFP, Benon Sevan, personally accepted $147,184 in bribes from Saddam's government, which Sevan denied.

By the late 1990s, the Iraqi economy showed signs of modest growth, which would continue until 2003: Iraq's gross domestic product increased from US$10.8 billion in 1996 to US$30.8 billion in 2000. The OFFP was the major factor in this growth, as it led to the inflow of hard currency, which helped reduce inflation. (Another factor was illegal transactions, as many countries began to simply ignore the sanctions.) While internal and external trade was revitalized, this did not lead to a significant increase in the standard of living for the majority of the population; on the contrary, the government tried to prevent benefits from flowing to Shi'ite areas in southern Iraq to persuade more countries to oppose the sanctions. In 2000, the national income per capita was estimated to be US$1,000—less than half of what it had been in 1990, according to Robert Litwak.

== Effects on the Iraqi people during sanctions ==
High rates of malnutrition, lack of medical supplies, and diseases from lack of clean water were reported during the sanctions. In 2001, the chairman of the Iraqi Medical Association's scientific committee sent a plea to The BMJ to help it raise awareness of the disastrous effects the sanctions were having on the Iraqi healthcare system.

In January 1991, the U.S. Defense Intelligence Agency (DIA) prepared a detailed study of Iraq's water treatment system. Titled "Iraq Water Treatment Vulnerabilities," the DIA study noted that Iraq's water treatment system was particularly vulnerable to sanctions, noting that "it probably will take at least six months (to June 1991) before the system is fully degraded," as supply levels of crucial water treatment chemicals such as chlorine and aluminium sulphate were "known to be critically low" and their "[i]mportation [have] been embargoed." The study thus predicted an increase in disease and even "epidemics of such diseases as cholera, hepatitis, and typhoid" if the sanctions remained in place. The percentage of Iraqis with access to clean drinking water dropped from an estimated 90 per cent in 1990 to 41 per cent in 1999.

In 1993, the UN Food and Agriculture Organization (FAO) reported that the sanctions "have virtually paralyzed the whole economy and generated persistent deprivation, chronic hunger, endemic undernutrition, massive unemployment and widespread human suffering." Denis Halliday, the UN Humanitarian Coordinator in Baghdad, Iraq, resigned in October 1998 after a 34-year career with the UN in order to have the freedom to criticise the sanctions regime, saying "I don't want to administer a programme that satisfies the definition of genocide." However, Sophie Boukhari, a UNESCO Courier journalist, reports that "some legal experts are skeptical about or even against using such terminology" and quotes Mario Bettati for the view that "People who talk like that don't know anything about law. The embargo has certainly affected the Iraqi people badly, but that's not at all a crime against humanity or genocide."

Halliday's successor, Hans von Sponeck, subsequently also resigned in protest, calling the effects of the sanctions a "true human tragedy". Jutta Burghardt, head of the World Food Programme in Iraq, followed them.

=== Impact on agriculture ===
Throughout the Ba'ath Party's rule over Iraq, the agricultural sector had been under-performing. Those in the U.S. who supported sanctions believed that low agricultural production in Iraq (coupled with sanctions) would lead to "a hungry population", and "a hungry population was an unruly one". The Iraqi government, which understood the serious effects the sanctions could have on Iraq, was able to increase agricultural output by 24 percent from 1990 to 1991. During the sanction years, the agricultural sector witnessed "a boom of unprecedented proportions". Iraq's Revolutionary Command Council (RCC) introduced several decrees during this period to increase agricultural performance. These decrees may be separated into three categories:

- They introduced severe penalties on farmers (or landowners) unable to produce at full capacity on their land.
- Government programs made it cheaper (and therefore more profitable for farmers and landowners) to produce.
- Programs were initiated to increase the amount of arable land.

The RCC introduced Decree No. 367 in 1990, which stated that all lands which were not under production by their owners would be taken over by the state; if the owner could not use all of the land he owned, he would lose it. However, the RCC's policy was not "all stick and no carrot". The government made it easier for farmers and landowners to receive credit. On 30 September 1990, the Ministry of Agriculture announced that it would increase loans to farmers by 100 percent, and would subsidize machinery and tools. In October 1990, the RCC stated it was planning to utilize and exploit "every inch of Iraqi arable land". While official statistics cannot be trusted entirely, they showed massive growth in arable land: from 16,446 donums in 1980 to 45,046 donums in 1990. In turn, irrigation projects were launched to meet the increased demand for water in Iraq's agricultural sector. The increase in agricultural output does not mean that hunger was not widespread; prices of foodstuffs increased dramatically during this period. However, overall the sanctions failed and (indirectly) led to an unprecedented improvement in agriculture, creating a constituency of farmers in central Iraq who had a vested interest in the sanctions remaining in effect. Data from 1990 is also consistent with the observation that destruction wrought by the 1991 Gulf War may be more responsible than the sanctions themselves for reducing Iraq's capacity to increase food production further.

Joseph Sassoon commented on Iraq's successful use of food rationing to mitigate the effects of sanctions and war, suggesting that Iraq's government was not wholly lacking in competence or efficiency despite being portrayed as such by critics.

=== Estimates of excess deaths due to sanctions ===
During the 1990s and 2000s, many surveys and studies concluded that excess deaths in Iraq—specifically among children under the age of 5—greatly increased during the sanctions at varying degrees. On the other hand, several later surveys conducted in cooperation with the post-Saddam government during the U.S.-led occupation of Iraq "all put the U5MR in Iraq during 1995–2000 in the vicinity of 40 per 1000," suggesting that "there was no major rise in child mortality in Iraq after 1990 and during the period of the sanctions."

In 1991, the International Study Team (IST) conducted an independent nationally representative household survey and found that mortality among children under the age of 5 increased from 43.2 deaths per 1000 births prior to Operation Desert Storm to 128.5 deaths per 1000 births during the first eight months of 1991; when extrapolated, this accounted for approximately 46,900 excess deaths from January to August 1991. In 1995, the UN Food and Agriculture Organization (FAO) conducted a small survey representative of Baghdad's neighbourhoods and reported that the under-5 child mortality rate had increased to 206 per 1000 births by August 1995; extrapolating approximately 567,000 deaths of children under the age of 5. However, when Sarah Zaidi—one of the study's coauthors—carried out follow-up surveys and reinterviews in 1996 and 1997: "65 deaths recorded in 1995 were not reported in 1996, and nine recorded in 1996 were not reported in 1995"; of 26 women interviewed in 1995 and 1997, "Nine child deaths that had been recorded in 1995 but not in 1996 were confirmed ... 13 were not confirmed, and four miscarriages and stillbirths were found to have been mistakenly recorded as deaths in 1995." Moreover, the results of the 1996 survey (38 deaths per 1000 births) was less than one-fifth that of the 1995 survey (206 deaths per 1000 births), leading Zaidi to conclude that "an accurate estimate of child mortality in Iraq probably lies between the two surveys." Zaidi later told Michael Spagat: "My guess is that 'some' Iraqi surveyors recorded deaths when they did not take place or the child had died outside the time frame but they specified the opposite." Nevertheless, epidemiologist Richard Garfield writes that the Baghdad studies "cannot be used as a national estimate [of mortality] because, as in most developing countries, mortality is likely to be higher outside the capital city," and projects that "Assuming that a quarter of all under 5s live in Baghdad, the 1996 [survey] mortality estimate would project to a national rate in the range 47–100" deaths per 1000 births.

In 1999, Garfield—utilizing a statistical model and "Information from twenty-two field studies, including data from thirty-six nutritional assessments ... demographic estimates from nine sources, three Iraqi government reports, ten UN-related reports, and eighteen press and research reports," as well as "four large, well designed and managed studies examining death rates among [Iraqi] children from 1988 through 1998"—estimates that from 1991 to 1996, deaths among children under 5 reached, at a minimum, 80 per 1000 births; by March 1998, a likely 227,000 excess deaths among children under 5 had occurred, "an average of about 60 excess deaths each day." In 2000, Garfield, citing new data, recalculated his estimate to 350,000 excess deaths.

Later on in 1999, the UN International Children's Emergency Fund (UNICEF) published a study called the "Iraq Child and Maternal Mortality Survey" (ICMMS). Using survey data from nearly 40,000 households collated in cooperation with Iraqi government and autonomous Kurdistan Region field workers, the ICMMS found that Iraq's under-5 child mortality rate increased from 56 deaths per 1000 births (during 1984–1989) to 131 deaths per 1000 births (during 1994–1999), which when extrapolated yields an estimate between 400,000 and 500,000 excess deaths among children under 5. The ICMMS reported that the autonomous Kurdistan Region experienced a lower child mortality rate (69 deaths per 1000 births) than the rest of Iraq. Several reasons have been cited for this: Kurdistan Region was subject to lesser sanctions; has borders with neighbouring countries that are more open than the rest of the country, making trade easier; and Oil-for-Food Programme aid was delivered to Kurdistan faster and at a higher per capita rate compared to the rest of Iraq.

In 2005, an Independent Inquiry Committee (IIC) set up by UN Secretary-General Kofi Annan argued that, "for all [its] flaws," data found in Iraq's 1997 census "make the very sharp surge in mortality reported by [ICMMS] somewhat implausible," even commenting that the ICMMS data "may have been 'tampered with.'" However, in 2007, researchers John Blacker, Mohamed M. Ali, and Gareth Jones pointed out that the 1997 census relied on "data obtained in a format that had elsewhere been rejected as unreliable 30 years earlier," and that the results between the independent IST survey conducted in 1991 (128.5 per 1000 births) and the ICMMS (131 deaths per 1000 births) closely matched each other, indicating the latter's reliability. Although Iraqi government field workers conducted the interviews, they were supervised by UNICEF personnel; "any instructions to falsify the data would have had to be slipped in behind [UNICEF's] backs." The researchers also commented that for such tampering to occur, it "would have had to involve the insertion of fictitious births and deaths into the records," which "would have been almost impossible to effect without introducing serious distortions into the pattern of birth intervals" but there is no evidence that this occurred. They thus "maintain that the ICMMS is the most reliable, indeed the only reasonably reliable source of information on mortality in Iraq in the 1990s."

In 2017, researchers Tim Dyson and Valeria Cetorelli in The BMJ described "the rigging of the 1999 Unicef survey" as "an especially masterful fraud," citing that three comprehensive surveys (using full birth histories) conducted with the post-invasion Iraqi government—namely, the 2004 Iraq Living Conditions Survey (ILCS), which was initially discounted by the Volcker Committee for finding far fewer child deaths than expected, and the Multiple Indicator Cluster Surveys (MICS) carried out by UNICEF and Iraq's Ministry of Health (MOH) in 2006 and again in 2011—all found that the child mortality rate in the period 1995–2000 was approximately 40 per 1000, which means that "there was no major rise in child mortality in Iraq after 1990 and during the period of the sanctions," although a "slight increase" in child mortality did occur "between 1990 and 1991." As a corollary, "there was no major improvement in child mortality" as a result of the 2003 invasion of Iraq, contrary to claims made by some of its proponents. Per Dyson and Cetorelli, "the UN unobtrusively changed its own U5MR estimates in 2009."

== Controversies ==
=== Culpability ===
Scholar Ramon Das, in the Human Rights Research Journal of the New Zealand Center for Public Law, examined each of the "most widely accepted ethical frameworks" in the context of violations of Iraqi human rights under the sanctions, finding that "primary responsibility rests with the UNSC" under these frameworks, including rights-utilitarianism, moral Kantianism, and consequentialism. By contrast, some academics, American and UN officials, and Iraqi citizens contend that this ignores the consequences of allowing Saddam to continue his policies with no deterrence and unlimited capacity.

=== Controversy about regional differences ===
Some commentators blame Saddam Hussein for the excess deaths reported during this period. For example, Rubin argued that the Kurdish and the Iraqi governments handled OFFP aid differently, and that therefore the Iraqi government policy, rather than the sanctions themselves, should be held responsible for any negative effects. Likewise, Cortright claimed: "The tens of thousands of excess deaths in the south-center, compared to the similarly sanctioned but UN-administered north, are the result of Baghdad's failure to accept and properly manage the UN humanitarian relief effort." In the run-up to the Iraq War, some disputed the idea that excess mortality exceeded 500,000, because the Iraqi government had interfered with objective collection of statistics (independent experts were barred).

Other Western observers, such as Matt Welch and Anthony Arnove, argue that the differences in results noted by authors such as Rubin may have been because the sanctions were not the same in the two parts of Iraq, due to several regional differences: in the per capita money, in war damage to infrastructure and in the relative ease with which smugglers evaded sanctions through the porous Northern borders. Spagat argued in response that "it is hard to believe that these factors could completely overwhelm the major disadvantages of the Kurdish Zone in which perhaps 20% of the population was internally displaced compared to about 0.3% in the South/Centre" and that the Iraq Family Health Survey (IFHS) suggests a higher (albeit declining) child mortality rate in the Kurdistan Region than elsewhere in Iraq during the mid-1990s.

=== Arguments about the sanctions and the Iraq War ===
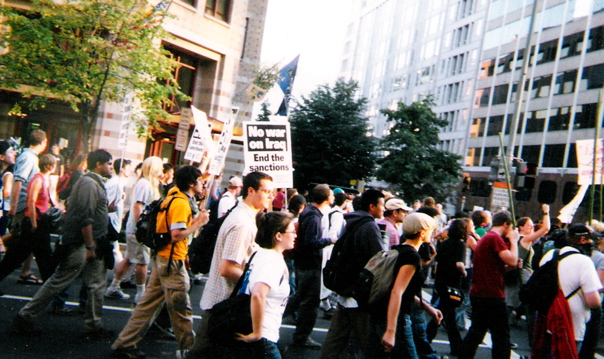
Protesters in Washington DC against sanctions and invasion of Iraq, 2002 or 2003

Some analysts, such as Walter Russell Mead, accepted a large estimate of casualties due to sanctions, but argued that invading Iraq was better than continuing the sanctions regime, since "Each year of containment is a new Gulf War."

=== Albright interview ===
On May 12, 1996, Madeleine Albright (then U.S. Ambassador to the United Nations) appeared on a 60 Minutes segment in which Lesley Stahl (referring to the 1995 FAO study) asked her "We have heard that half a million children have died. I mean, that's more children than died in Hiroshima. And, you know, is the price worth it?" and Albright replied "I think this is a very hard choice, but the price, we think the price is worth it." Albright wrote later that Saddam Hussein, not the sanctions, was to blame. She criticized Stahl's segment as "amount[ing] to Iraqi propaganda"; said that her question was a loaded question; wrote "I had fallen into a trap and said something I did not mean"; and regretted coming "across as cold-blooded and cruel". The segment won an Emmy Award. Albright's "non-denial" was taken by sanctions opponents as confirmation of a high number of sanctions related casualties.

=== Iraq Inquiry ===
The Iraq Inquiry led by Sir John Chilcot examined a February 2003 statement by then-British Prime Minister Tony Blair that "today, 135 out of every 1,000 Iraqi children die before the age of five". The inquiry found that the figure in question was provided to Blair by Secretary of State for International Development Clare Short and the Foreign & Commonwealth Office (FCO) based on the 1999 ICMMS study, but an internal caveat from the FCO and the Department for International Development (DFID) to the effect that the ICMMS was of questionable reliability because it had been "conducted with the Iraqi regime's 'help' and relied on some Iraqi figures" was not communicated to Blair by a 10 Downing Street official. The inquiry noted "The level of child mortality in Iraq estimated by the ICMMS was significantly higher than that estimated by later surveys," citing "estimates that the under‑five mortality rate in Iraq was 55 per 1,000 in 1989, 46 per 1,000 in 1999, 42 per 1,000 in 2003, and 37 per 1,000 in 2010 (when Mr Blair gave his evidence to the Inquiry)."

== Lifting of sanctions ==
Following the 2003 U.S. invasion, the sanctions regime was largely ended on May 22, 2003 (with certain exceptions related to arms and to oil revenue) by paragraph 10 of UNSC Resolution 1483. On 15 December 2010, the UNSC in a series of resolutions (i.e., Resolution 1956, Resolution 1957, and Resolution 1958) "voted to return control of Iraq's oil and natural gas revenue to the government on 30 June [2011] and to end all remaining activities of the [OFFP]".

Iraq's Chapter VII obligations "concerning the return of Kuwaiti and third-State nationals" were rescinded in June 2013 by Resolution 2107. In December 2021, Iraq's central bank announced that it had paid off its entire debt of $52 billion in war reparations to Kuwait.

== Legacy ==
In a 1998 fatwā, al-Qaeda leader Osama bin Laden cited the sanctions against Iraq as a justification for attacks against Americans. Bin Laden stated that the sanctions had caused the deaths of 1.5 million Iraqi children in an effort "to destroy Iraq, the most powerful neighboring Arab state."

In a 2015 article in the journal International Affairs, Francesco Giumelli noted that the UNSC had largely abandoned comprehensive sanctions in favor of targeted sanctions since the mid-1990s, with the controversy over the efficacy and civilian harms attributed to the Iraq sanctions playing a significant role in the change: "The sanctions imposed on Iraq in 1990 covered all goods entering or leaving the entire country, whereas those imposed today are most often directed against individuals or non-state entities, and are more limited in scope. ... The widespread view ... that 500,000 Iraqi children died as a result of UN comprehensive sanctions itself rang the death knell for the perceived utility of comprehensive measures." In a similar vein, Albright herself told an interviewer in 2020 that "we learned in many ways that comprehensive sanctions often hurt the people of the country and don't really accomplish what is wanted in order to change the behavior of the country being sanctioned. So we began to look at something called 'smart sanctions' or 'targeted sanctions.'"

== See also ==
- ABCD line
- Authorization for Use of Military Force Against Iraq Resolution of 2002
- Iraqi no-fly zones conflict
- Sanctions against Iran
- Sanctions against Syria
- United States embargo against Cuba
- United States sanctions against China
