= Iraq–Mexico relations =

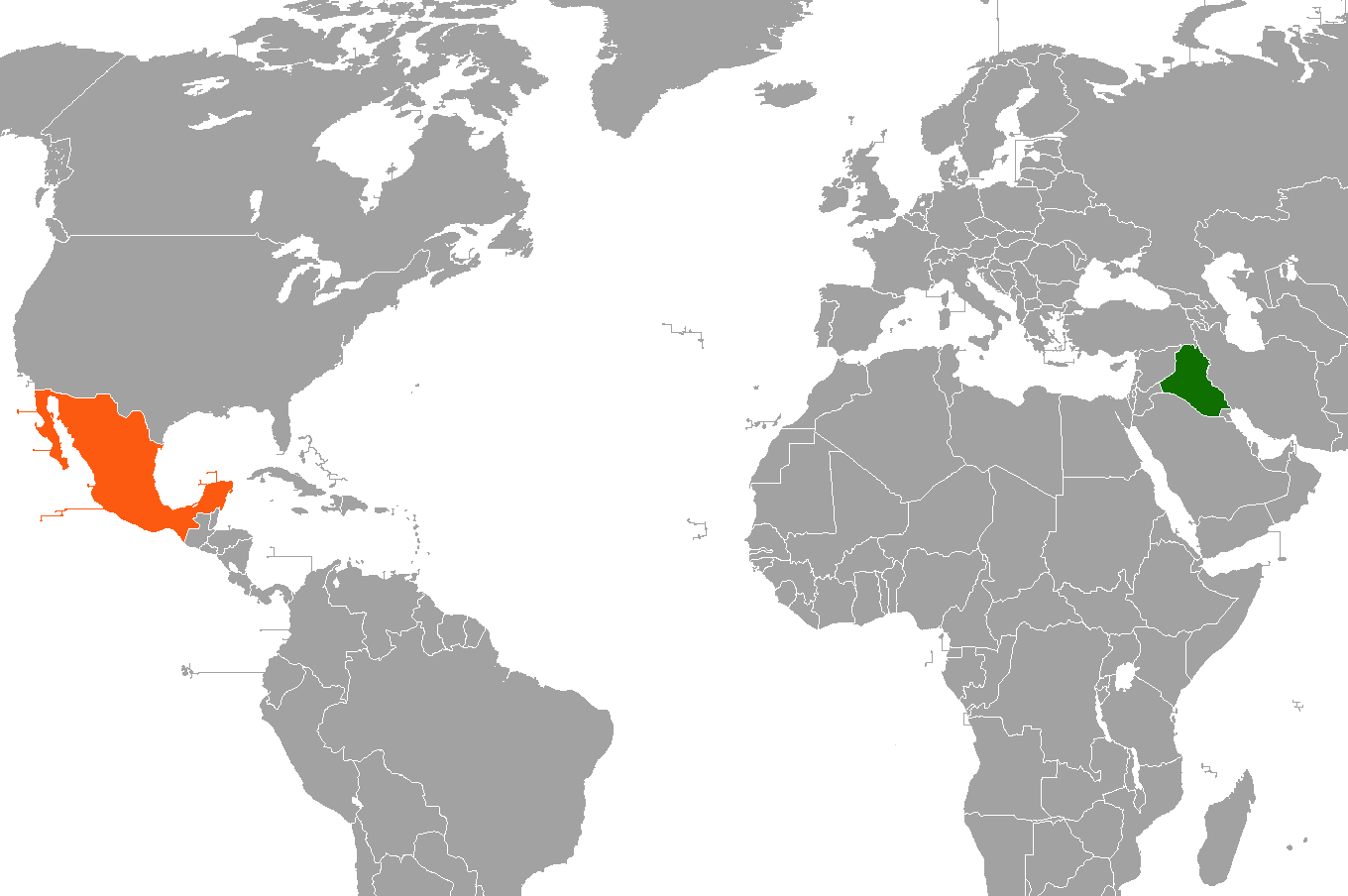

- Iraq: Mexico

The nations of Iraq and Mexico established diplomatic relations in 1950. Both nations are members of the United Nations.

== History ==
In the late 1800s and early 1900s, several waves of Arab migration arrived in Mexico, with many coming from present-day Iraq. In 1932, Iraq obtained its independence from the United Kingdom. On 25 September 1950, Iraq and Mexico established diplomatic relations. In 1977, Iraq opened an embassy in Mexico City and in 1978, Mexico opened an embassy in Baghdad.

In 1980, Mexico was elected as a non-permanent member of the United Nations Security Council. In September 1980, with regards to the Iran–Iraq War, Mexico voted in favor of United Nations Security Council Resolution 479 calling on both Iran and Iraq to immediately cease the use of force and settle all disputes through negotiations. In 1981, Mexico condemned Israel for bombing Iraq's nuclear reactors just outside of Baghdad known as Operation Opera. In April 1986, Mexico closed its embassy in Baghdad as a result of the Iran–Iraq War.

In August 1990, Iraqi forces invaded Kuwait, triggering the First Gulf War. Mexico condemned Iraq's invasion and intention of annexing Kuwait and Mexico supported the United Nations Security Council Resolution 660 and demanded that Iraq withdraw its troops from Kuwait and supported sanctions against President Saddam Hussein's government. In 2002, Mexico was again elected as a non-permanent member to the United Nations Security Council. That year, the United States tried to persuade Mexico to support an American invasion of Iraq on the pretense of Iraq maintaining Weapon of mass destruction, however, Mexico refused to support the invasion of and refused to break off diplomatic relations with Iraq. In March 2003, Mexico condemned the Iraq War.

For a brief period in 2003, Iraq closed its embassy in Mexico City, however, re-opened its diplomatic mission later that year. As a non-permanent member of the UN Security Council, Mexico voted in favor of the following resolutions concerning Iraq: Resolution 1441, Resolution 1483 and Resolution 1500. Since the Iraq War, Mexico has supported and voted in favor for the reconstruction of and supporting activities for the benefit of Iraq and its people and to preserve the fundamental right of the Iraqi people over their natural resources, as well as their inalienable right to decide their own future.

In July 2023, the Director General for the Americas of the Iraqi Ministry of Foreign Affairs, Haidar Shiyaa Al Barak, paid a visit to Mexico. During his visit, he met with representatives of the Secretariat of Agriculture to work and discuss the signing of a memorandum of understanding between both nations, and analyzing the development of projects related to production in arid zones and sustainable water management.

== High-level visits ==
High-level visits from Iraq to Mexico

- Foreign Deputy Minister Munthir Uraim (1979)
- Trade Minister Mohammed Mahdy Saleh (2002)
- Director General for the Americas of the Ministry of Foreign Affairs Haidar Shiyaa Al Barak (2023)

== Scholarships ==
Each year, the Mexican government, through the Secretariat of Foreign Affairs, has granted scholarships to Iraqi nationals to carry out specialty studies such as master's degrees, doctorates, doctoral research or postdoctoral stays, and in addition, they may also take Spanish language and Mexican culture studies for six months at the National Autonomous University of Mexico, Teaching Center for Foreigners.

== Trade ==
In 2023, trade between Iraq and Mexico totaled US$80.5 million. Iraq's main exports to Mexico include: felt tip pens and markers. Mexico's main exports to Iraq include: valves and pipes, pumps for liquid, telephones and mobile phones, machinery and mechanical appliances, tubes and pipes of iron or steel, chemical based products, pepper, vegetables, citrus, and alcohol.

== Diplomatic missions ==
- Iraq has an embassy in Mexico City.
- Mexico is accredited to Iraq from its embassy in Abu Dhabi, United Arab Emirates.

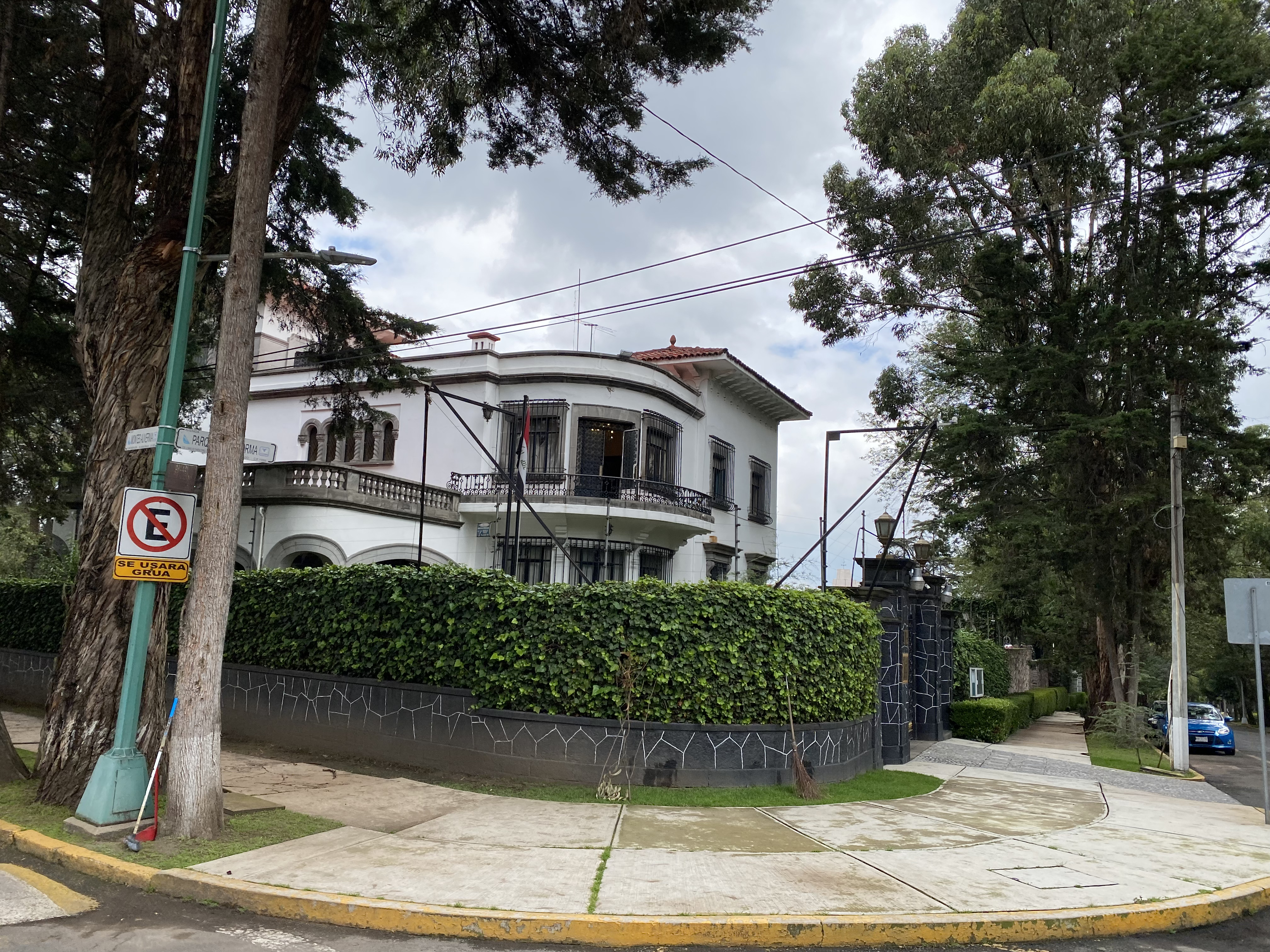
Embassy of Iraq in Mexico City

== Gallery ==
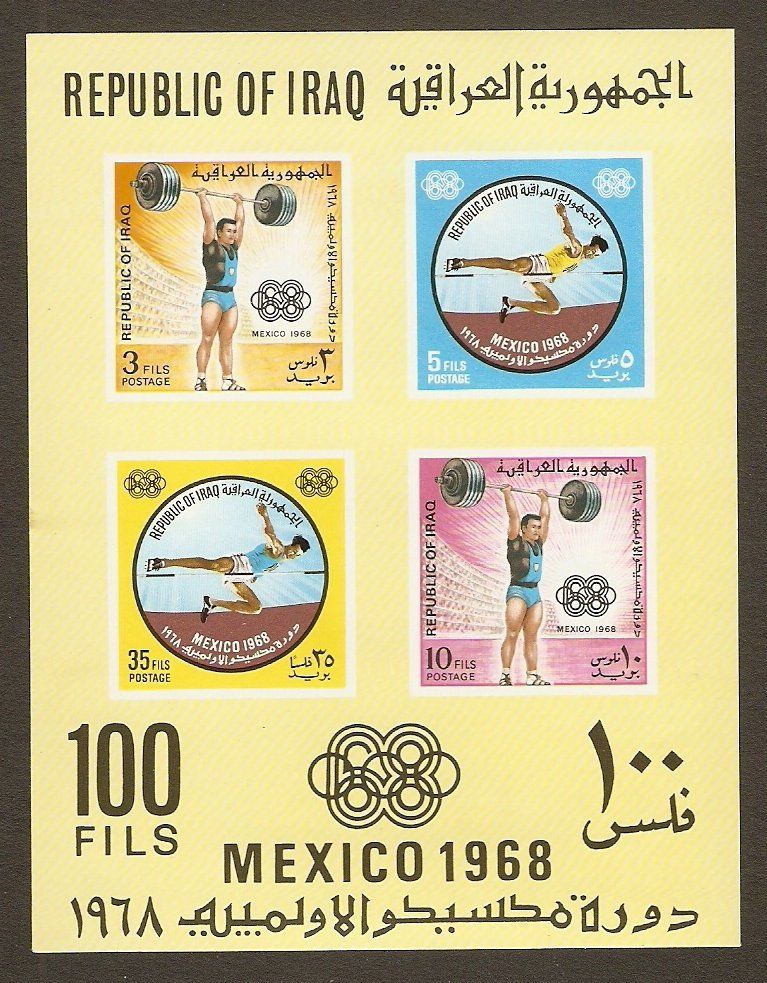
Iraqi stamp commemorating the 1968 Summer Olympics in Mexico

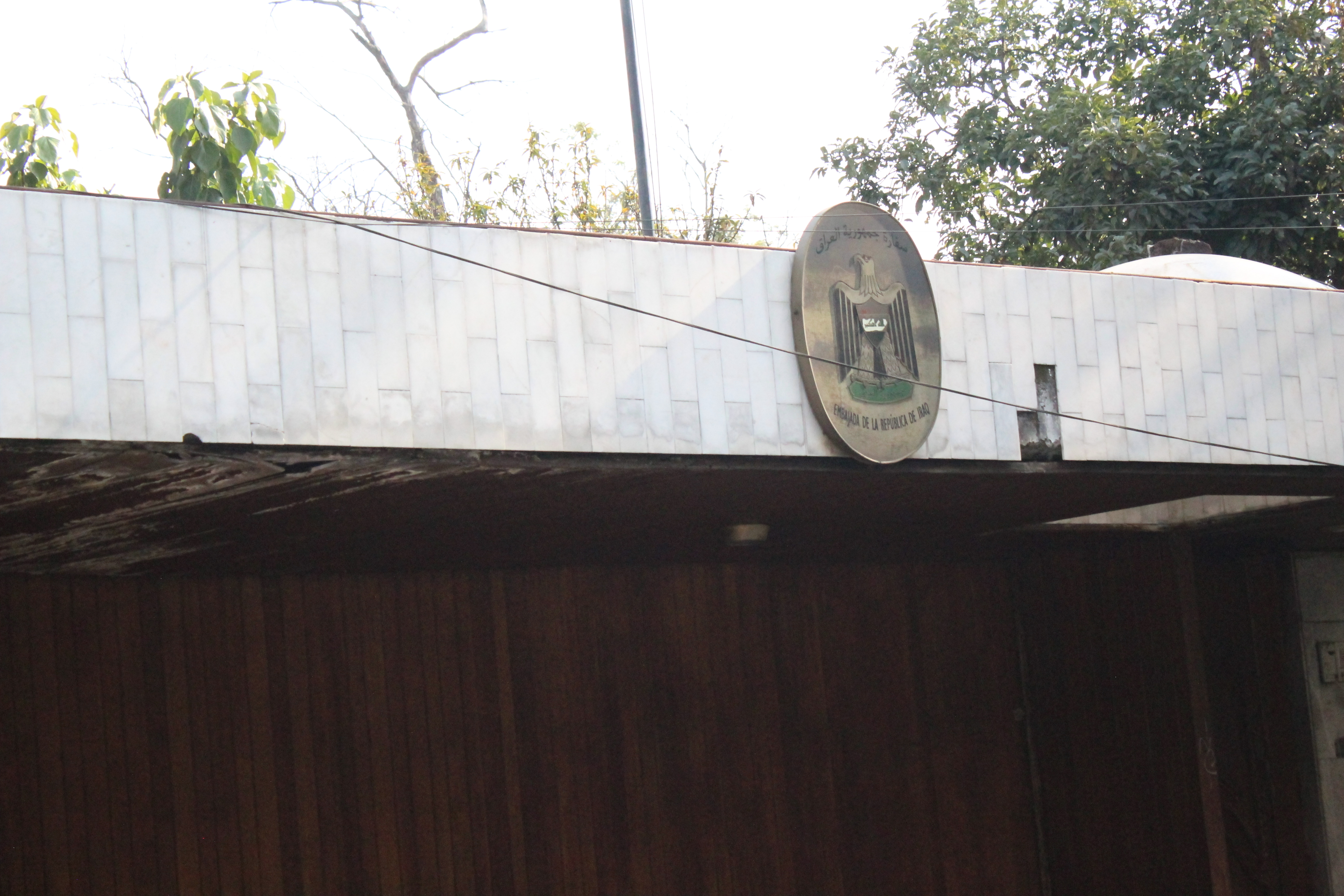
Residence of the Ambassador of Iraq in Mexico City

== See also ==
- Foreign relations of Iraq
- Foreign relations of Mexico
