= United Nations Security Council Resolution 1700 =

UN Security Council Resolution 1700
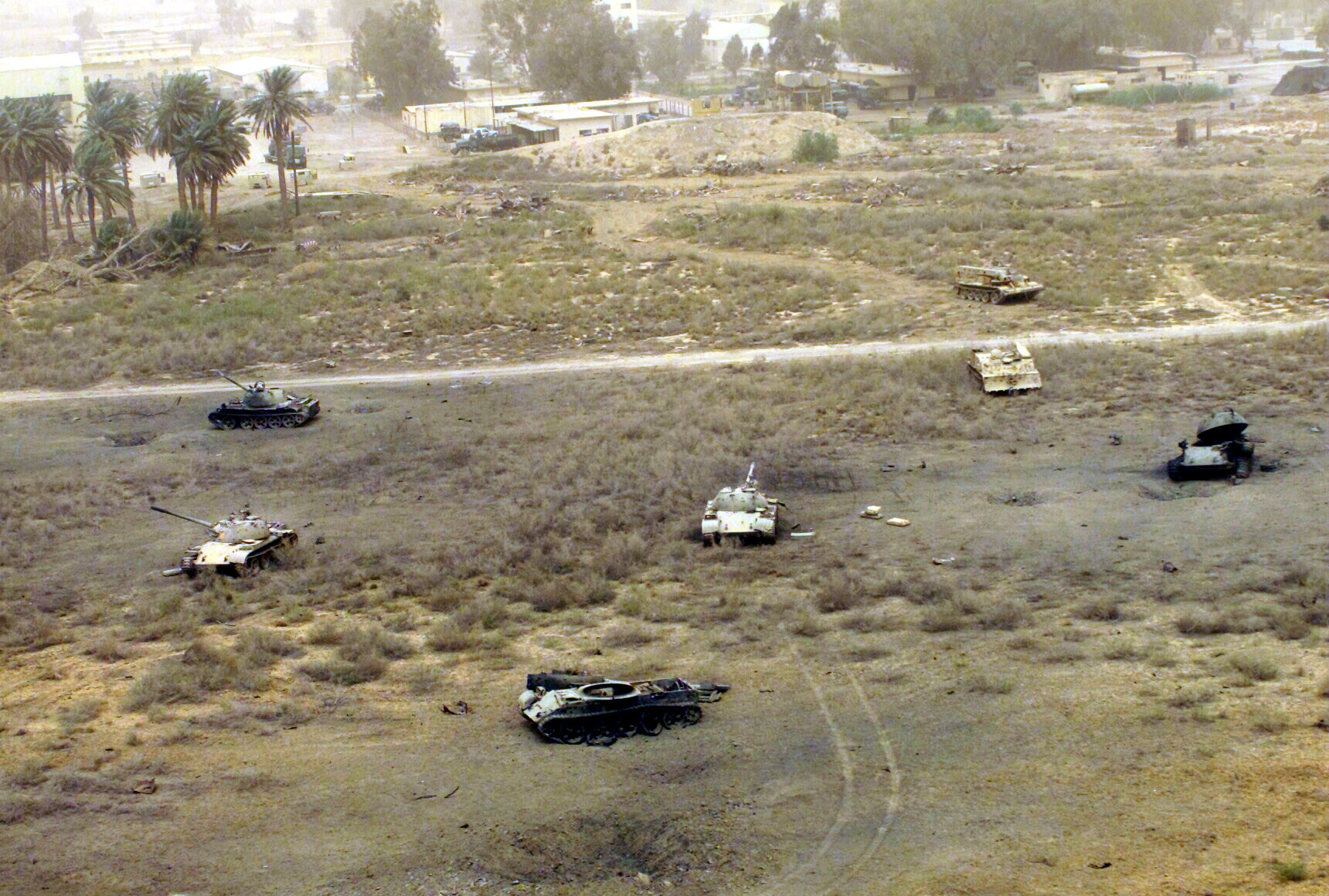
- Destroyed tanks in Iraq
- Date: 10 August 2006
- Meeting no.: 5,510
- Code: S/RES/1700 (Document)
- Subject: The situation concerning Iraq
- Voting summary: 15 voted for; None voted against; None abstained
- Result: Adopted

Security Council composition
- Permanent members: China; France; Russia; United Kingdom; United States
- Non-permanent members: Argentina; Rep. of the Congo; Denmark; Ghana; Greece; Japan; Peru; Qatar; Slovakia; Tanzania

United Nations Security Council Resolution 1700, adopted unanimously on August 10, 2006, after recalling previous resolutions on Iraq, particularly resolutions 1500 (2003), 1546 (2004), 1557 (2004) and 1619 (2005), the Council extended the mandate of the United Nations Assistance Mission in Iraq (UNAMI) for a further period of twelve months until August 10, 2007.

The Security Council reaffirmed the sovereignty and territorial integrity of Iraq, and the role of the United Nations in the country through the strengthening of institutions and promote national dialogue, the latter of which was crucial for Iraq's stability and unity. It welcomed the view of Iraq that there continued to be a crucial role for UNAMI in assisting the country to build a "productive and prosperous nation at peace with itself and its neighbours".

Extending UNAMI's mandate for an additional twelve months, the Council declared its intention to review its mandate if requested to do so by the Iraqi government. Finally, the Secretary-General Kofi Annan was required to update the Council regularly on developments relating to the International Compact of Iraq.

== See also ==
- Iraq War
- List of United Nations Security Council Resolutions 1601 to 1700 (2005–2006)
- Multi-National Force – Iraq
