= United Nations Security Council Resolution 1958 =

UN Security Council Resolution 1958
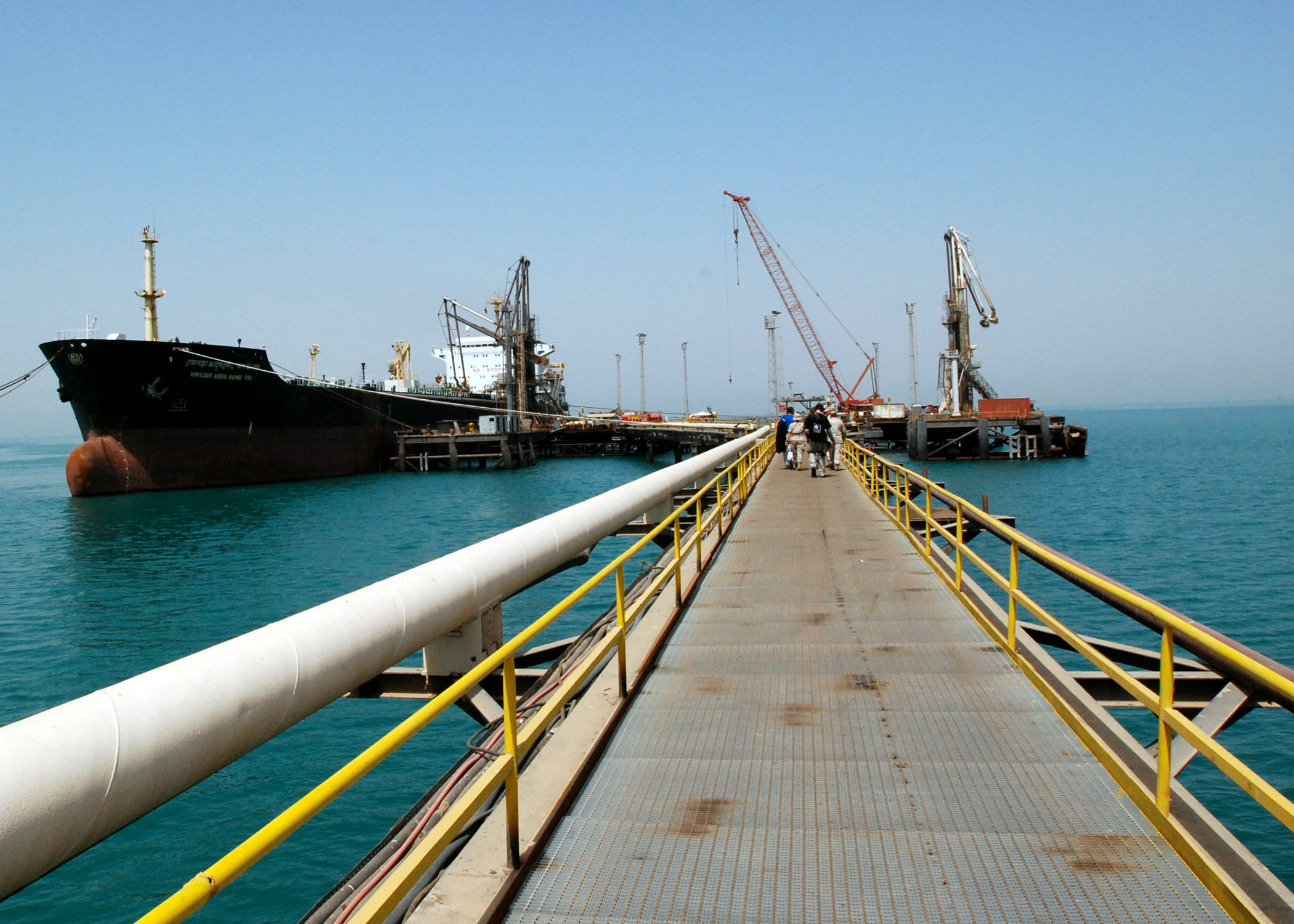
- Iraqi oil platform
- Date: 15 December 2010
- Meeting no.: 6,450
- Code: S/RES/1958 (Document)
- Subject: The situation concerning Iraq
- Voting summary: 14 voted for; None voted against; 1 abstained
- Result: Adopted

Security Council composition
- Permanent members: China; France; Russia; United Kingdom; United States
- Non-permanent members: Austria; Bosnia–Herzegovina; Brazil; Gabon; Japan; Lebanon; Mexico; Nigeria; Turkey; Uganda

United Nations Security Council Resolution 1958, adopted on December 15, 2010, after recalling resolutions 986 (1995), 1472 (2003), 1476 (2003), 1483 (2003) and 1546 (2004) on the situation in Iraq, the Council terminated the residual activities of the Oil-for-Food Programme.

Resolution 1958, along with resolutions 1956 (2010) and 1957 (2010), ended some major restrictions placed on Iraq. However, demands that Iraq resolve disputes with Kuwait remained. The high-level meeting was chaired by United States Vice President Joe Biden.

The resolution was passed with 14 votes in favour to none against, and one abstention from France, which said additional financial guarantees were required.

== Resolution ==
=== Observations ===
The Council began by recalling the need for the Oil-for-Food Programme as a temporary measure to provide humanitarian aid to the Iraqi people and the need for the country to regain an international standing to the level of that prior to the adoption of Resolution 661 (1990).

=== Acts ===
Acting under Chapter VII of the United Nations Charter, the Council requested the Secretary-General Ban Ki-moon to terminate the residual activities of the Oil-for-Food Programme. He was authorised to establish an escrow account with independent public accountants, in which US$20 million would be retained for the use of United Nations until December 31, 2016, and a further US$131 million retained as compensation for the United Nations with regard to activities in connection with the Programme since its inception in 1995. All remaining funds in the account created by Resolution 1483 were to be transferred to the Development Fund for Iraq.

The resolution further requested the Secretary-General to ensure the effective implementation of the resolution and report to the Council.

== See also ==
- Iraq and weapons of mass destruction
- Iraq War
- List of United Nations Security Council Resolutions 1901 to 2000 (2009–2011)
- Post-invasion Iraq
- United Nations Assistance Mission in Iraq
