= United Nations Security Council Resolution 1957 =

UN Security Council Resolution 1957
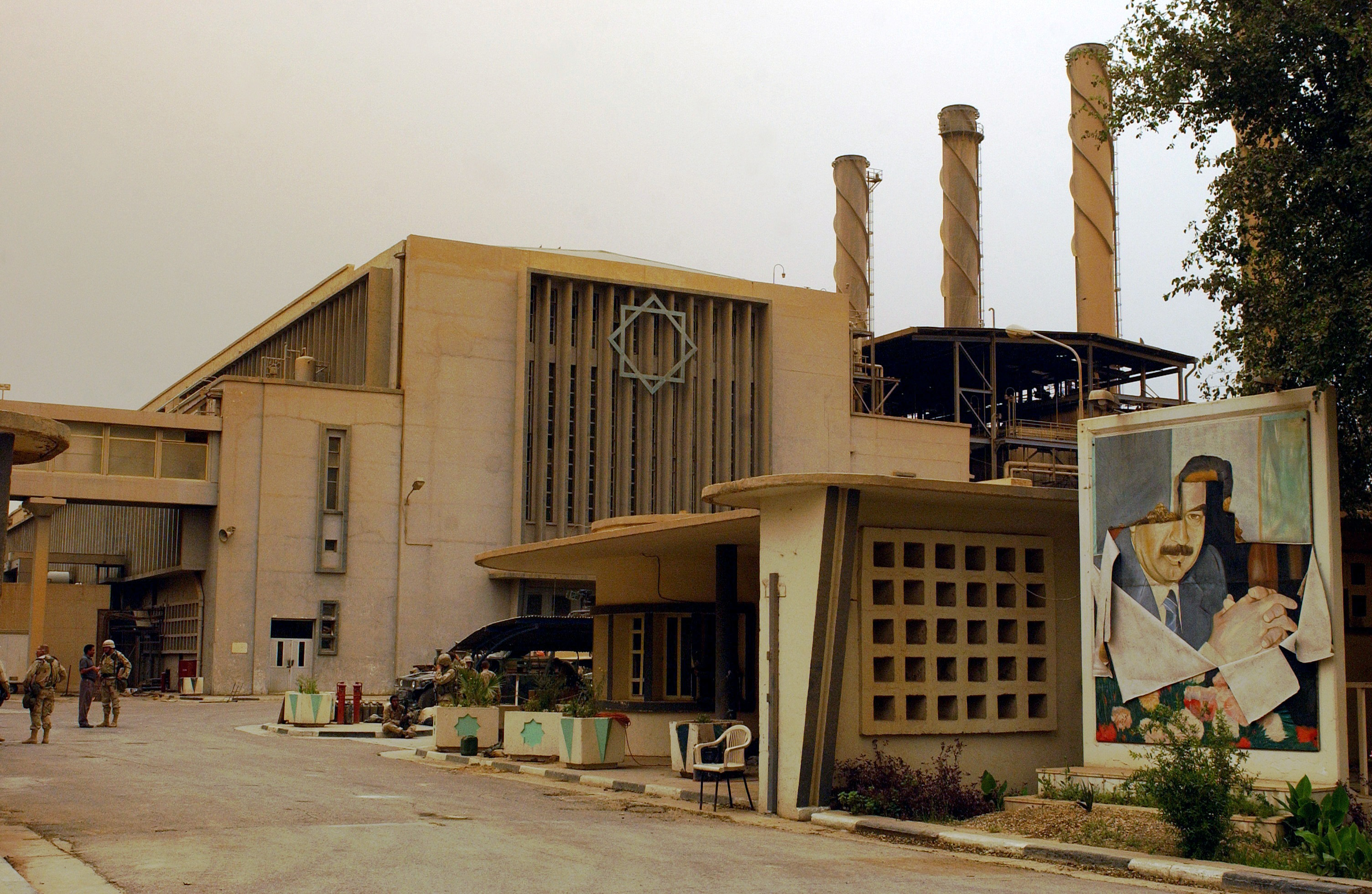
- Power plants in Baghdad
- Date: 15 December 2010
- Meeting no.: 6,450
- Code: S/RES/1957 (Document)
- Subject: The situation concerning Iraq
- Voting summary: 15 voted for; None voted against; None abstained
- Result: Adopted

Security Council composition
- Permanent members: China; France; Russia; United Kingdom; United States
- Non-permanent members: Austria; Bosnia–Herzegovina; Brazil; Gabon; Japan; Lebanon; Mexico; Nigeria; Turkey; Uganda

United Nations Security Council Resolution 1957, adopted unanimously on 15 December 2010, after recognising positive developments in Iraq since the adoption of 661 (1990), the Council lifted sanctions relating to weapons of mass destruction, long-range ballistic missiles, and the acquisition of nuclear weapons.

Resolution 1957, along with resolutions 1956 (2010) and 1958 (2010), ended some major restrictions placed on Iraq. However, demands that Iraq resolve disputes with Kuwait remained. The high-level meeting was chaired by United States Vice President Joe Biden.

== Resolution ==
=== Observations ===
In the preamble of the resolution, the Council welcomed a letter by the Foreign Minister Hoshyar Zebari which confirmed the Iraqi government's support for non-proliferation and disarmament regimes. It also welcomed that the International Atomic Energy Agency had reported good co-operation with Iraq, which had become the 186th state to subscribe to the Chemical Weapons Convention and the 131st to sign the International Code of Conduct against Ballistic Missile Proliferation.

=== Acts ===
Acting under Chapter VII of the United Nations Charter, the Council ended the weapons of mass destruction, missile, and civil nuclear-related measures imposed in resolutions 687 (1991) and 707 (1991). It urged Iraq to ratify the Comprehensive Nuclear-Test-Ban Treaty and the Additional Protocol to the Comprehensive Safeguards Agreement. The Council stated it would review progress made by Iraq in a year.

== See also ==
- Iraq and weapons of mass destruction
- Iraq War
- List of United Nations Security Council Resolutions 1901 to 2000 (2009–2011)
- Post-invasion Iraq
- United Nations Assistance Mission in Iraq
