= United Nations Security Council Resolution 1956 =

UN Security Council Resolution 1956
- Iraqi flag
- Date: 15 December 2010
- Meeting no.: 6,450
- Code: S/RES/1956 (Document)
- Subject: The situation concerning Iraq
- Voting summary: 15 voted for; None voted against; None abstained
- Result: Adopted

Security Council composition
- Permanent members: China; France; Russia; United Kingdom; United States
- Non-permanent members: Austria; Bosnia–Herzegovina; Brazil; Gabon; Japan; Lebanon; Mexico; Nigeria; Turkey; Uganda

United Nations Security Council Resolution 1956, adopted unanimously on December 15, 2010, after recognising positive developments in Iraq since the adoption of 661 (1990), the Council terminated UN supervised arrangements for the Development Fund for Iraq with effect from June 30, 2011.

Resolution 1956, along with resolutions 1957 (2010) and 1958 (2010), ended some major restrictions placed on Iraq. However, demands that Iraq resolve disputes with Kuwait remained. The high-level meeting was chaired by United States Vice President Joe Biden.

== Resolution ==
=== Observations ===
The Security Council began by welcoming the letter from the Prime Minister of Iraq, Nouri al-Maliki which reaffirmed the commitment of the Iraqi government not to request further extensions of arrangements for the Development Fund for Iraq, and that revenues from oil would be used fairly. It recalled the significant role of the Development Fund and the International Advisory and Monitoring Board.

=== Acts ===
Acting under Chapter VII of the United Nations Charter, the Council decided to terminate arrangements established in Resolution 1483 (2003) for depositing proceeds from exports of petroleum, petroleum products and natural gas into the Development Fund for Iraq and its monitoring by the International Advisory and Monitoring Board on June 30, 2011. After this date, the arrangements would not apply, and 5 percent of the proceeds would be deposited in the Compensation Fund established in Resolution 687 (1991).

The resolution called upon the Iraqi government to work with the Secretary-General towards a post-Development Fund mechanism, with a full transfer of its funds to government successor account by June 30, 2011. The Secretary-General was instructed to provide reports every six months on progress.

== See also ==
- Iraq War
- List of United Nations Security Council Resolutions 1901 to 2000 (2009–2011)
- Post-invasion Iraq
- United Nations Assistance Mission in Iraq
