= Richard Garfield (nursing professor) =

American academic

Richard M. Garfield
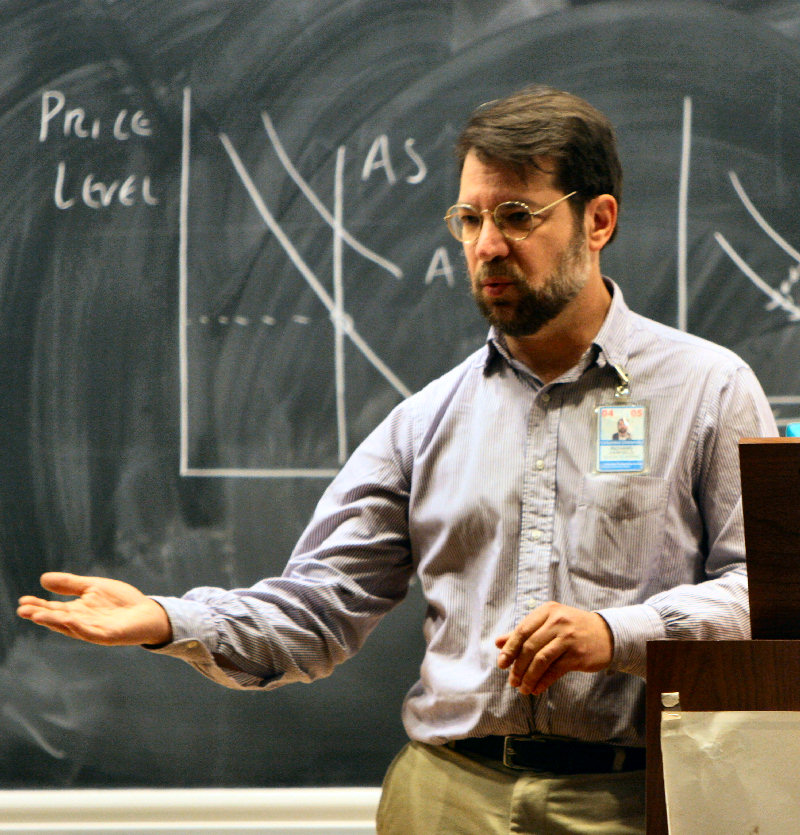
- Born: October 27, 1953 (age 72); Utica, New York
- Scientific career
- Fields: Public health, Nursing
- Institutions: Columbia University

Richard M. Garfield (born October 27, 1953) is the Henrik H. Bendixen Professor Emeritus of Clinical International Nursing, Professor Emretus of Clinical Population and Family Health, and Special Lecturer at Columbia University School of Nursing.

In 2013, Garfield joined the US Centers for Disease Control and Prevention as Team Lead for Assessment, Surveillance, and Information Management in the Emergency Response and Recovery Branch of the US Centers for Disease Control and Prevention in Atlanta, Georgia. He continues as staff member of the US CDC in the Health Systems Branch, Division of Global Health Protection leading activities in Global Health Protection. He has been visiting professor at the London School of Tropical Medicine and Hygiene and the Karolinska Institute in Sweden.

Garfield worked with health authorities in Central America in malaria control, where wars during the 1980s stymied disease control efforts. He helped reorganize health services to protect civilians from the impact of conflict. In the 1980s and 1990s Garfield quantified the impact of conflict on noncombatants using epidemiologic methods and studied the effects of economic sanctions on health in Iraq, Cuba, Nicaragua, South Africa, Haiti, and the former Yugoslavia. He is known for estimates of mortality changes related to conflict. On Iraq, Gulf War and UN sanctions against Iraq. Journalist Matt Welch praised Garfield's work on this controversial subject:

Those who get past the initial frustrations of researching [ Iraq sanctions ] usually end up on Richard Garfield's doorstep. His 1999 report ... picked apart the faulty methodologies of his predecessors, criticized the bogus claims of the anti-sanctions left, admitted when the data were shaky, and generally used conservative numbers. Among his many interesting findings was that every sanctions regime except the one imposed on apartheid South Africa led to limitations of food and medicine imports, even though such goods were almost always officially exempt from the embargo. "In many countries," he wrote, "the embargo-related lack of capital was more important than direct restrictions on importing medicine or food."

Welch reported his updated conclusion:

Between August, 1991, and March, 1998, there were between 106,000 and 227,000 excess deaths of children under five. Recently, he has estimated the latter, less conservative number at 500,000 plus between 1990 and 2002. The chief causes? "Contaminated water, lack of high-quality foods, inadequate breast-feeding, poor weaning practices and inadequate supplies in the curative health care system. This was the product of both a lack of some essential goods, and inadequate or inefficient use of existing essential goods."

And, of course, sanctions. "Even a small number of documentable excess deaths is an expression of a humanitarian disaster, and this number is not small," he concluded.

Garfield believes that during the last few years of oil-for-food, most of the blame for poor child mortality figures can be laid on the government of Iraq.

Garfield was the founding director of the Health and Nutrition Tracking Service at the World Health Organization (WHO), continues to consult with WHO on non-communicable diseases and information systems, assisted in developing the Global Health Center at the CDC and coordinated the Collective Violence risk group of the third round of Global Burden of Disease estimates. He has taken part in large scale needs assessment surveys for the UN related organizations following disasters in Myanmar, Pakistan, Haiti, South Sudan, and in New Orleans. He has assisted in developing applied methods of epidemiologic assessment to the area of emergencies and disasters, and currently does this as a member of the team at The Assessment Capacities Project (ACAPS) in Geneva.
