= Robert Litwak =

American vice president and director for WWICS

Robert Sutherland Litwak (born April 5, 1953) is senior vice president and director of International Security Studies at the Woodrow Wilson International Center for Scholars in Washington D.C. He is also an adjunct professor at Georgetown University’s School of Foreign Service and a consultant to the Los Alamos National Laboratory.

== Career ==
Litwak served on the National Security Council staff as director for Nonproliferation in the first Clinton Administration.

His most recent books are Rogue States and U.S. Foreign Policy: Containment after the Cold War and Regime Change: U.S. Strategy through the Prism of 9/11.

Litwak has held visiting fellowships at the Harvard Center for International Affairs, the International Institute for Strategic Studies, the Russian Academy of Sciences, Oxford University, and the United States Institute of Peace. He is a member of the Council on Foreign Relations, and received a doctorate in international relations from the London School of Economics.
