= United Nations Security Council Resolution 1619 =

UN Security Council Resolution 1619
- Iraq
- Date: 11 August 2005
- Meeting no.: 5,247
- Code: S/RES/1619 (Document)
- Subject: The situation concerning Iraq
- Voting summary: 15 voted for; None voted against; None abstained
- Result: Adopted

Security Council composition
- Permanent members: China; France; Russia; United Kingdom; United States
- Non-permanent members: Algeria; Argentina; Benin; Brazil; Denmark; Greece; Japan; Philippines; Romania; Tanzania

United Nations Security Council resolution 1619, adopted unanimously on 11 August 2005, after reaffirming previous resolutions on Iraq, particularly resolutions 1500 (2003), 1546 (2004) and 1557 (2004), the Council extended the mandate of the United Nations Assistance Mission in Iraq (UNAMI) for a further period of twelve months.

The Security Council reaffirmed the sovereignty and territorial integrity of Iraq, and the role of the United Nations in the country. It stressed that UNAMI should assist with national dialogue, which was "crucial for Iraq's political stability and unity". Extending UNAMI's mandate for an additional twelve months, the Council declared its intention to review its mandate if requested to do so by the Iraqi government.

== See also ==
- Iraq War
- List of United Nations Security Council Resolutions 1601 to 1700 (2005–2006)
