= United Nations Security Council Resolution 2107 =

UN Security Council Resolution 2107
- Date: 27 June 2013
- Meeting no.: 6990
- Code: S/RES/2107 (Document)
- Subject: The situation between Iraq and Kuwait
- Voting summary: 15 voted for; None voted against; None abstained
- Result: Unanimously Adopted

Security Council composition
- Permanent members: China; France; Russia; United Kingdom; United States
- Non-permanent members: Argentina; Australia; Azerbaijan; Guatemala; South Korea; Luxembourg; Morocco; Pakistan; Rwanda; Togo

United Nations Security Council Resolution 2701 is a United Nations Security Council resolution adopted unanimously on 27 June 2013. It removes Iraq from its obligations concerning the return of Kuwaiti and third-state nationals or their remains to their proper state that were seized under the former Saddam regime. Following the passage of the resolution, Hoshyar Zebari, Iraq's foreign minister, said that it marked a turning point in Iraq's relationship with the international community, and a significant step in the process of mending bilateral ties.

All the negative aspects of the relationship between the countries have become part of the past. We will focus on the present and the future, and what the brotherly relations can achieve to consolidate peace, security and stability in the region.
