= United Nations Security Council Resolution 1830 =

UN Security Council Resolution 1830
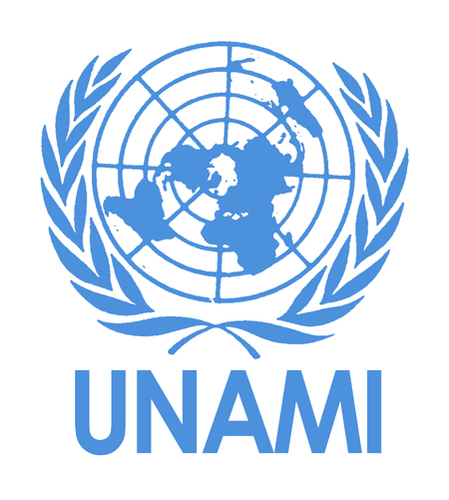
- UNAMI logo
- Date: 7 August 2008
- Meeting no.: 5,950
- Code: S/RES/1830 (Document)
- Subject: The situation concerning Iraq
- Voting summary: 15 voted for; None voted against; None abstained
- Result: Adopted

Security Council composition
- Permanent members: China; France; Russia; United Kingdom; United States
- Non-permanent members: Burkina Faso; Belgium; Costa Rica; Croatia; Indonesia; Italy; Libya; Panama; South Africa; Vietnam

United Nations Security Council Resolution 1830 was unanimously adopted on 7 August 2008.

== Resolution ==
Unanimously adopting resolution 1830 (2008), the Council further decided that the Secretary-General’s Special Representative and the United Nations Assistance Mission for Iraq (UNAMI) should continue to pursue their expanded mandate, in accordance with the request by the Government of Iraq and as stipulated in resolution 1770 (2007).

Recognizing that the security of United Nations personnel was essential for UNAMI to carry out its work, the Council called on the Government of Iraq and other Member States to continue providing security and logistical support to the United Nations presence in the country. In that connection, the 15-member body welcomed Member States’ contributions in providing UNAMI with the financial, logistical and security resources and support it needed to fulfil its mission.

Expressing its intention to review the Mission’s mandate in 12 months or sooner, if requested by the Iraqi Government, the Council requested the Secretary-General to report quarterly on progress made towards fulfilment of all UNAMI’s responsibilities.

== See also ==
- List of United Nations Security Council Resolutions 1801 to 1900 (2008–2009)
