= United Nations Security Council Resolution 1883 =

UN Security Council Resolution 1883
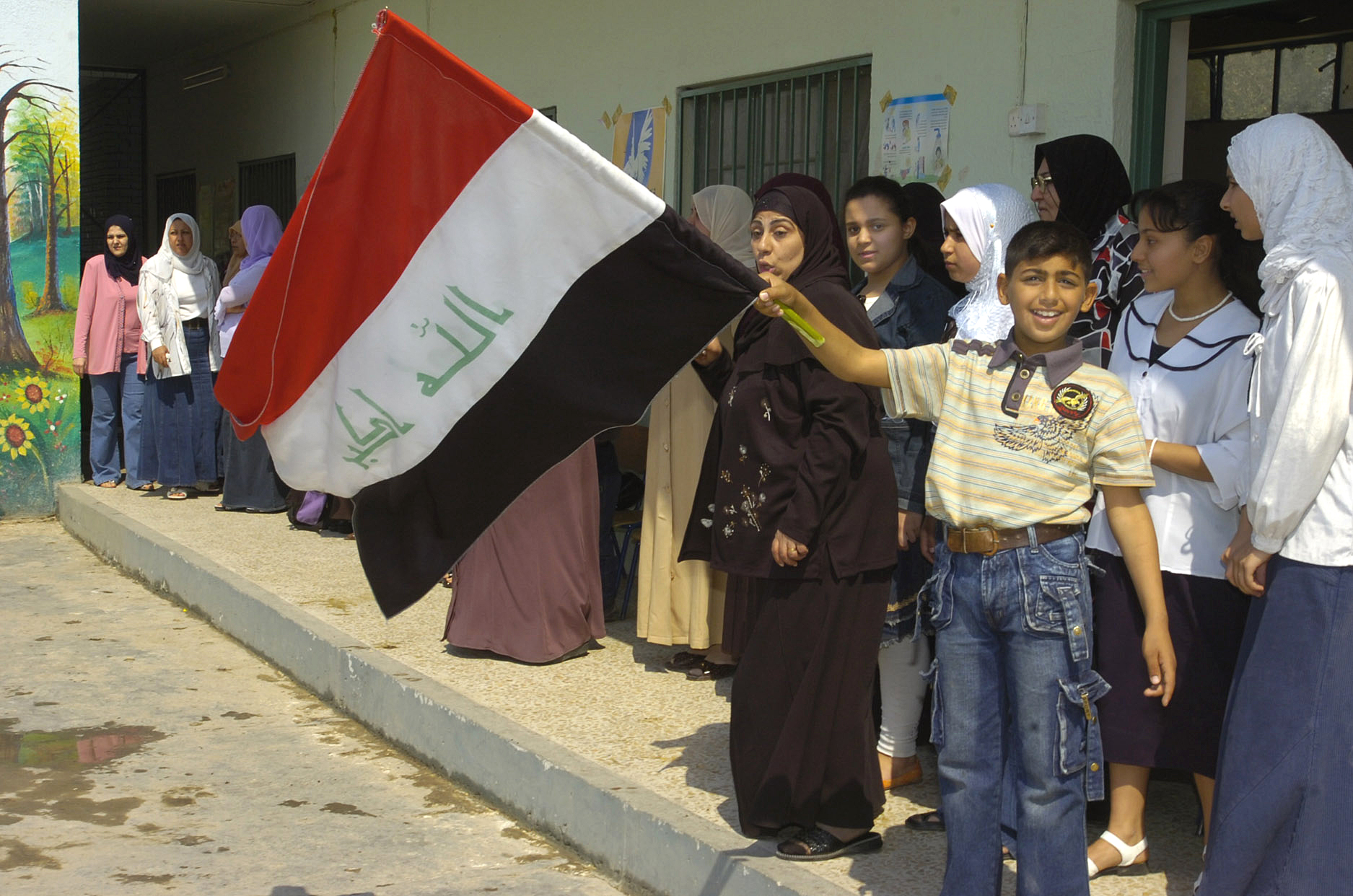
- Flag of Iraq
- Date: 7 August 2009
- Meeting no.: 6,179
- Code: S/RES/1883 (Document)
- Subject: The situation concerning Iraq
- Voting summary: 15 voted for; None voted against; None abstained
- Result: Adopted

Security Council composition
- Permanent members: China; France; Russia; United Kingdom; United States
- Non-permanent members: Austria; Burkina Faso; Costa Rica; Croatia; Japan; Libya; Mexico; Turkey; Uganda; Vietnam

United Nations Security Council Resolution 1883 was unanimously adopted on 7 August 2009.

== Resolution ==
The Security Council, reiterating its support to the people and Government of Iraq in their efforts "to build a secure, stable, federal, united and democratic nation, based on the rule of law and respect for human rights", today extended the mandate of the United Nations Mission in that country for another year.

Unanimously adopting resolution 1883 (2009), the Council further decided that the Secretary-General’s Special Representative and the United Nations Assistance Mission for Iraq (UNAMI) should continue to pursue their expanded mandate, in accordance with the request by the Government of Iraq and as stipulated in resolutions 1770 (2007) and 1830 (2008).

[By those texts, the Council expanded the Organization’s political role in Iraq, aiming to bring together the strife-torn country’s rival factions, gain broader support from neighbouring countries and tackle the deepening humanitarian crisis. The head of UNAMI was authorized, among other things, to "advise, support and assist" the Iraqi Government in advancing an "inclusive, national dialogue and political reconciliation", and help the Government and relevant institutions develop processes for holding elections and referendums. Also expanded was the Special Representative’s role to bolster regional dialogue, including on issues of border security, energy and refugees.]

Recognizing that the security of United Nations personnel was essential for UNAMI to carry out its work, the Council called on the Government of Iraq and other Member States to continue providing security and logistical support to the United Nations presence in the country. In that connection, the 15-member body called on Member States to continue to provide UNAMI with the financial, logistical and security resources and support it needed.

Expressing its intention to review the Mission’s mandate in 12 months or sooner, if requested by the Iraqi Government, the Council requested the Secretary-General to report quarterly on progress towards fulfilling of all UNAMI’s responsibilities.

== See also ==
- List of United Nations Security Council Resolutions 1801 to 1900 (2008–2009)
