= United Nations Security Council Resolution 1770 =

UN Security Council Resolution 1770
- Date: 10 August 2007
- Meeting no.: 5,729
- Code: S/RES/1767 (Document)
- Subject: The situation concerning Iraq
- Voting summary: 15 voted for; None voted against; None abstained
- Result: Adopted

Security Council composition
- Permanent members: China; France; Russia; United Kingdom; United States
- Non-permanent members: Belgium; Rep. of the Congo; Ghana; Indonesia; Italy; Panama; Peru; Qatar; Slovakia; South Africa

United Nations Security Council Resolution 1770 was unanimously adopted on 10 August 2007.

== Resolution ==
Approving a 12-month mandate extension for the United Nations Assistance Mission for Iraq (UNAMI), the Security Council today expanded the world body’s political role in Iraq, aimed at bringing together the strife-torn country’s rival factions, gaining broader support from neighbouring countries, and tackling the deepening humanitarian crisis.

Unanimously adopting resolution 1770 (2007), the Council broadened the responsibilities of the four-year-old Mission, whose existing mandate expires today. Among other things, the measure authorized the head of UNAMI to "advise, support and assist" the Iraqi Government in advancing an "inclusive, national dialogue and political reconciliation", reviewing the Constitution, setting internal boundaries, and dealing with the millions of Iraqis who have fled their homes.

United Nations Secretary-General Ban Ki-moon immediately hailed the resolution’s adoption, telling the 15-nation Council that a peaceful and prosperous future was for Iraqis themselves to create, with the international community lending support to their efforts. The United Nations would be increasing its role and looked forward to working in "close partnership" with the Iraqi Government and people to encourage national political dialogue, help with humanitarian assistance and promote human rights.

== See also ==
- List of United Nations Security Council Resolutions 1701 to 1800 (2006–2008)
