= United Nations Security Council Resolution 1557 =

UN Security Council Resolution 1557
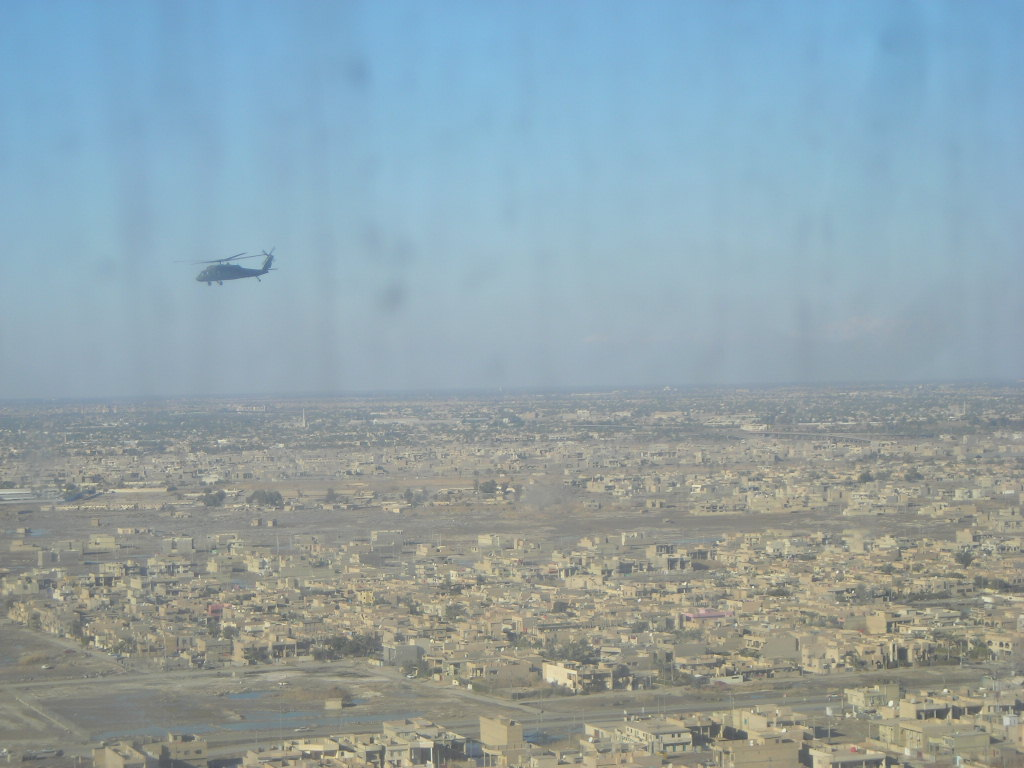
- American helicopter over Baghdad, Iraq
- Date: 12 August 2004
- Meeting no.: 5,020
- Code: S/RES/1557 (Document)
- Subject: The situation between Iraq and Kuwait
- Voting summary: 15 voted for; None voted against; None abstained
- Result: Adopted

Security Council composition
- Permanent members: China; France; Russia; United Kingdom; United States
- Non-permanent members: Algeria; Angola; Benin; Brazil; Chile; Germany; Pakistan; Philippines; Romania; Spain

United Nations Security Council resolution 1557, adopted unanimously on 12 August 2004, after reaffirming previous resolutions on Iraq, particularly resolutions 1500 (2003) and 1546 (2004), the Council extended the mandate of the United Nations Assistance Mission in Iraq (UNAMI) for a further period of twelve months. The resolution was drafted by the United Kingdom and United States.

The Security Council reaffirmed the sovereignty and territorial integrity of Iraq, and the role of the United Nations in the country. It welcomed the appointment of a Special Representative of the Secretary-General Ashraf Qazi, by the Secretary-General Kofi Annan. Extending UNAMI's mandate for an additional twelve months, the Council declared its intention to review its mandate if requested to do so by the Iraqi government.

== See also ==
- Iraq War
- List of United Nations Security Council Resolutions 1501 to 1600 (2003–2005)
