= United Nations Security Council Resolution 1500 =

UN Security Council Resolution 1500
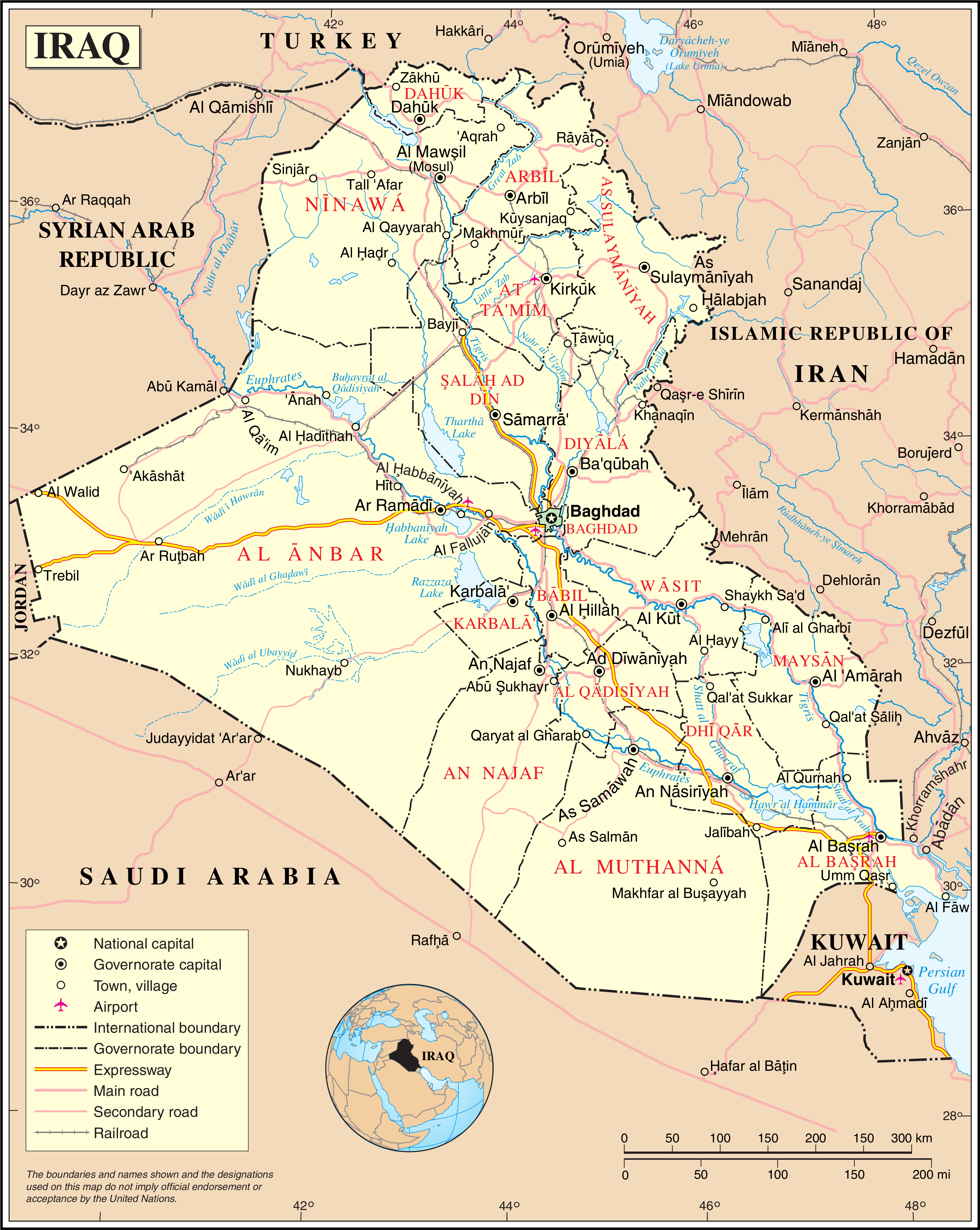
- Iraq
- Date: 14 August 2003
- Meeting no.: 4,808
- Code: S/RES/1500 (Document)
- Subject: The situation between Iraq and Kuwait
- Voting summary: 14 voted for; None voted against; 1 abstained
- Result: Adopted

Security Council composition
- Permanent members: China; France; Russia; United Kingdom; United States
- Non-permanent members: Angola; Bulgaria; Chile; Cameroon; Germany; Guinea; Mexico; Pakistan; Spain; Syria

United Nations Security Council resolution 1500, adopted on 14 August 2003, after reaffirming previous resolutions on Iraq, particularly Resolution 1483 (2003), the council established the United Nations Assistance Mission in Iraq (UNAMI) and welcomed the creation of the Iraqi Governing Council.

The Security Council reaffirmed the sovereignty and territorial integrity of Iraq, and the role of the United Nations in the country. It welcomed the creation of the Governing Council as an important step towards the formation of a representative and widely recognised government. The resolution also established UNAMI to assist the Secretary-General Kofi Annan in the implementation of his mandate under Resolution 1483 for an initial period of twelve months. UNAMI would also assist in the co-ordination of humanitarian and other functions.

Resolution 1500 was adopted by 14 votes to none against and one abstention from Syria. The Syrian representative said their vote reflected the opinion of the Arab World and of the need to end the occupation of Iraq, and had expressed regret at the consultation process that led to the adoption of the current resolution.

== See also ==
- Iraq War
- List of United Nations Security Council Resolutions 1401 to 1500 (2002–2003)
