= United Nations Assistance Mission for Iraq =

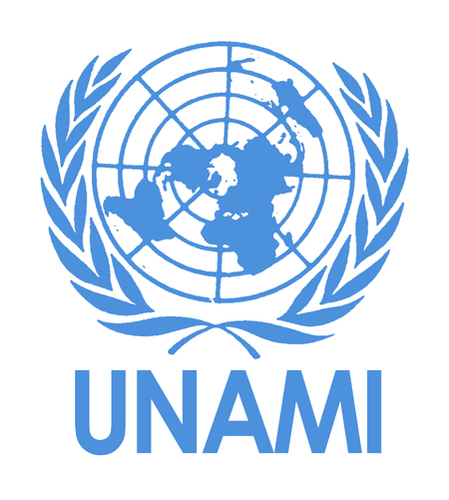
- Abbreviation: UNAMI
- Formation: 14 August 2003
- Type: Political mission
- Legal status: Completed
- Parent organization: United Nations Security Council

The United Nations Assistance Mission for Iraq (UNAMI; Arabic: بعثة الامم المتحدة لمساعدة العراق) was formed on 14 August 2003 by United Nations Security Council (UNSC) Resolution 1500 at the request of the Iraqi government to support national development efforts. The mission was officially terminated on 31 December 2025.

UNAMI's mandate included advising and assisting the government on political dialogue and national reconciliation; supporting political processes such as elections and the national census; facilitating regional dialogue between Iraq and neighboring countries; coordinating the delivery of humanitarian aid; advancing judicial and legal reforms; and promoting human rights.

The Mission's achievements included assisting in six national elections, coordinating humanitarian and financial assistance from the UN and third-party donors, and providing advisory support to the Council of Representatives, support which played a part in proceedings such as the drafting of Iraq's 2005 constitution, Since 2017, UNAMI has also worked to investigate and bring to justice members of ISIS for their crimes in the country.

UNAMI's mandate was subject to annual renewal and review by the UNSC; in 2019, Resolution 2682 extended its mandate until 31 May 2024. However, in May 2024, Iraq's prime minister, Mohammed Shia' Al Sudani wrote to UN secretary-general António Guterres, announcing that UNAMI must finalize its operations and declaring 31 December 2025 as the official end date of the Mission in Iraq. According to Al Sudani, the decision to end the mission was based on "the political and security stability Iraq is experiencing and the progress made in various fields". On 31 May 2024, the United Nations Security Council unanimously adopted Resolution 2732 accepting Iraq's request to terminate UNAMI on 31 December 2025.

== History ==
The United Nations has been operating in Iraq since 1955 through a variety of programmes; specialized agencies established their offices in the early 1990s, with UNAMI being established after the 2003 invasion of Iraq. Amid deteriorating conditions in 2007, the UN worked to progressively increase its presence in Iraq and continued to expand its operations throughout the country. The UN maintains its presence in Iraq through the Assistance Mission and the United Nations Country Team (UNCT), which regroups the 20 UN agencies currently operating in Iraq. Former Special Representative of the United Nations Secretary-General, Sérgio Vieira de Mello was among 22 killed in a 2003 suicide attack carried out against the United Nations. The death of the envoy who was seen as a likely candidate for Secretary-General left a lasting impact on the United Nations.

On 13 October 2023, the Secretary General of the United Nations appointed Volker Perthes of Germany as "Head, Independent Strategic Review of the United Nations Assistance Mission for Iraq Mandated by Security Council resolution 2682 (2023)". The purpose of the Independent Strategic Review was to: (a) assess the current threats to the peace and security of Iraq and the continued relevance of the Mission’s tasks and priorities; (b) provide recommendations to optimize the mandate, mission structure and staffing of UNAMI; and (c) assess options to support the Government of Iraq in strengthening effective regional cooperation on issues outlined in paragraph 2 (b) (iv) of the resolution.

Mr Perthes' final report was submitted to the United Nations' Security Council on 28 March 2024. The final report recommended that the Security Council "launch a time-bound and indicator-based transition of the Mission’s tasks to national institutions and the United Nations country team in a responsible, orderly and gradual manner". The final report provides that:

"Considering the current threats and challenges to the peace and security of Iraq, I have concluded that the core political functions of UNAMI, notably its good offices and advocacy, remain relevant. Its capacity-building activities in the areas of electoral assistance, human rights and cross-cutting United Nations priorities are also pertinent. They support long-term needs and are expected to remain relevant beyond the Mission’s eventual transition. They should therefore be gradually transferred to the United Nations country team as part of an overall reconfiguration of the United Nations presence in Iraq. Overall, UNAMI, in its present form, appears too big. Its mandate, priorities, activities, structure and staffing require streamlining to make it fit for the realities in Iraq."

For its part, the Iraqi government of Prime Minister Mohammed Shia' Al Sudani requested that UNAMI be dissolved, asserting that the mission has outlived its necessity. The government stated that "[t]his decision to end UNAMI's operations in Iraq, apart from the reasons mentioned, is a natural outcome of the evolving relationship between Iraq and the United Nations, fostering cooperation on different levels". On 17 May 2024, members of the United Nations Security Council debated and were divided on UNAMI's future, with the United States stating that UNAMI still had "important work to do," and making no mention of Baghdad’s request.

On 31 May 2024, the United Nations Security Council unanimously adopted Resolution 2732 in which it "requested that the Secretary-General prepare, in consultation with the Government of Iraq, a transition and liquidation plan to be completed by 31 December for UNAMI to start the transfer of its tasks, as well as the orderly and safe drawdown and withdrawal of its personnel and assets, including identification of an end date for liquidation activities in the country". UN secretary-general Guterres met with Sudani on 13 December 2025, during which they both commended Iraq's progress towards stability. Sudani stated that Iraq would continue to collaborate with the UN regardless of the missions' conclusion.

== Leadership ==
UNAMI is headed by the Special Representative of the UN Secretary-General (SRSG) for Iraq, who is supported by the Deputy Special Representative for Iraq for Political, Electoral and Constitutional Support, who oversees political and human rights affairs; and the Deputy Special Representative for Iraq, Resident and Humanitarian Coordinator, who oversees UN humanitarian and development efforts. The Mission is administered by the United Nations Department of Political Affairs and supported by the Department of Peacekeeping Operations and the Department of Field Support.

Ashraf Jehangir Qazi (2004–2005): Qazi was appointed SRSG in July 2004 and remained in position until September 2007.

Staffan de Mistura (2005–2009): De Mistura has a Swedish mother and an Italian father. He was appointed SRSG in September 2007. De Mistura remained in his position until July 2009.

Ad Melkert (2009–2011): Melkert is from the Netherlands. Melkert studied political science at the University of Amsterdam. Melkert was appointed SRSG in July 2009.

Martin Kobler (2011–2013): Kobler is from Germany. Kobler was appointed SRSG in August 2011.

Nickolay Mladenov (2013–2015): Mladenov is from Bulgaria. In 1995, he graduated from the University of National and World Economy, majoring in international relations. The following year he obtained an MA in war studies from King's College London. Mladenov was appointed as SRSG in August 2013. Mladenov remained in his post until February 2015, when he was appointed UN Special Coordinator for the Middle East Peace Process.

Ján Kubiš (2015–2019): Kubiš was appointed SRSG in February 2015. Kubiš is from Slovakia. Kubiš studied international relations at the University of Moscow. Kubiš remained in his post until December 2018. In January 2019, Kubiš was appointed United Nations Special Coordinator for Lebanon.

Jeanine Hennis-Plasschaert (2019–2024): Jeanine Hennis-Plasschaert of the Netherlands was appointed SRSG in 2019, succeeding Ján Kubiš of Slovakia in December 2018. The Deputy Special Representative for Political, Electoral and Constitutional Affairs was Alice Walpole of the United Kingdom, While Ghulam Isaczai of Afghanistan served as the Deputy Special Representative responsible for humanitarian and development efforts.

Mohammed Al Hassan (2024–2025): Mohamed Al Hassan of the Sultanate of Oman was appointed SRSG of the mission in 2024, succeeding Jeanine Hennis-Plasschaert of the Netherlands in July 2024.

In 2023, there were approximately 648 personnel, 251 international staff and 397 national staff working for UNAMI.

== Mandate ==
The final mandate of UNAMI was extended to 31 December 2025, adopted on 31 May 2024. Its task was to support Iraq against terrorism, reaffirm the independence, sovereignty, unity, and territorial integrity of Iraq, and to promote the Government of Iraq's to promote reforms, actions on displaced peoples, human rights, and more.

The mandate functioned to provide electoral assistance to Iraq:

- Assists Iraq to strengthen electoral processes, providing advice and support
- Works to ensure safety and fairness in elections
- Include female participation in elections
- Report on electoral preparation and processes

The mandate was tasked with the facilitation of Iraq-Kuwait relations, and the resolution of prevalent issues:

- The return of Kuwaiti National Archives and property
- Return of nationals or their remains

The mandate supports the return and integration of displaced persons:

- Ensures access to documentation for displaced persons
- Support the reconstruction of areas liberated, and support for survivors of terrorist attacks

The mandate was to provide civil and social services to Iraq:

- Healthcare
- Education

Support development, reconstruction, and reform efforts:

- Strengthen ownership of initiatives for reconstruction and development
- Support economic reform and development, in coordination with organizations, institutions, and agencies

Promote human rights progress:

- Promote the protection of human rights
- Support judicial and legal reform, and strengthen law processes
- Improving governance and economic goals
- Support children affected by conflict
- Support children reintegration and protection efforts

== Military representatives and guards ==
- Fiji - 160 troops, who are responsible for protecting UN buildings and staff in the Green Zone. Trained, equipped and transported to Iraq by Australia, the contingent was first deployed to Iraq in December 2004, at which time it consisted of 134 troops.
- Nepal - 77 troops and one military observer. After Fiji, Nepal bears the most responsibility for guarding UN assets in Iraq.

=== Former Participants ===
- Romania - 100 Romanian soldiers were sent to Iraq in March 2005 for a six-month deployment in support of UNAMI (in addition to Romania's contribution to the US-led Coalition).
- Georgia - Around 550 soldiers were deployed in March 2005 to perform UN protection duties (in addition to Georgia's contribution to the US-led Coalition). However, they were placed under U.S. command on a "middle ring security" mission in the Green Zone, and were later redeployed to join the Georgian Multinational Force Iraq contingent.
- Canada - One military observer was deployed from October 2004 to July 2007.
- Austria - One military observer.
- United Kingdom - One military observer.
- United States - Four military observers.
- Denmark - One military observer. Previously, around 35 troops had been deployed as UN guards (in addition to Denmark's contribution to the US-led Coalition).
- New Zealand - One military observer.
- Australia - Two military observers and one defence civilian.
- Jordan - Two military observers.

== See also ==
- Multinational Force in Iraq
