= Mamadou Gouro Sidibe =

IT engineer

Mamadou Gouro Sidibe was born in Mali. He is an IT engineer, computer scientist, innovator, and entrepreneur. He is the founder and developer of Lenali. Lenali is a social media application like Facebook, but uses voice-based technology in local African languages. He refers to himself as a Digital inclusive entrepreneur.

== Career ==
Sidibe studied in Russia and France. He received a PhD in computer sciences from the University of Versailles in France. He worked ten years on research and development projects that was funded by the European Commission in computer networks and multimedia.

Sidibe started his own company in 2017 and developed the Lenali. The Lenali is a voice-based social network application that works with spoken language. It was initially developed into such languages as Bambara, Soninke, Songhay, Moore, Wolof, and French. The Lengai computer application is free. Applications that Sidibe has developed are; Lenali, Gafe, and Kunko.

Lenali is a free vocal social media application (app) developed by Sidibe in 2017. It uses voice technology in local African languages and in French. It was developed for people who do not read or write. Features are voice tutorials, profiles, posts, picture posts, get voice instructions, create a profile, comments and GPS navigation calls. According to UNSCO Mali has a literacy rate of 40%. It allows smartphone users to communication using voice technology in their local languages.

Kunko is a computer application developed by Sidibe. It uses voice interaction in local languages to report COVID-19 suspected cases to contact institutions and authorized authorities. It uses sound, photos, voice mail, video posts, and a GPS navigator.

Gafe Digital is a standard and functional literacy application.

Sidibe is listed in the African Exponent 2018, Quartz Innovators list among the top 30 African Innovators.
