= Tom de Bruijn =

Dutch diplomat and politician

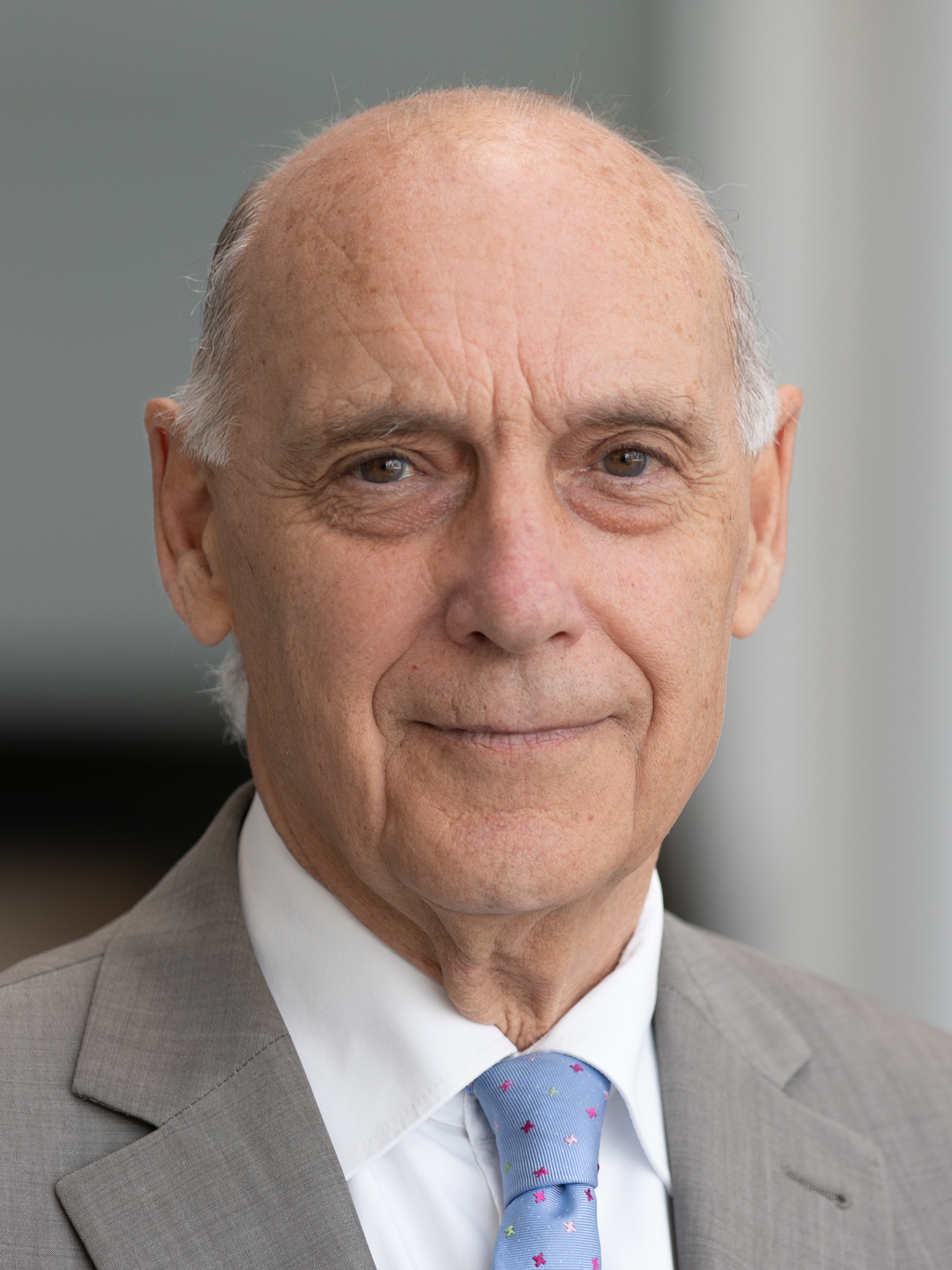
- De Bruijn in 2021

Minister of Foreign Affairs
- Acting
- In office 17 September 2021 – 24 September 2021
- Prime Minister: Mark Rutte
- Preceded by: Sigrid Kaag
- Succeeded by: Ben Knapen

Minister for Foreign Trade and Development Cooperation
- In office 10 August 2021 – 10 January 2022
- Prime Minister: Mark Rutte
- Preceded by: Sigrid Kaag
- Succeeded by: Liesje Schreinemacher

Mayor of The Hague
- Ad interim
- In office 1 March 2017 – 17 March 2017
- Preceded by: Jozias van Aartsen
- Succeeded by: Pauline Krikke

Alderman in The Hague
- In office 26 June 2014 – 7 June 2018

Permanent Representative of the Netherlands to the European Union
- In office 1 January 2003 – 31 May 2011
- Preceded by: Ben Bot
- Succeeded by: Pieter de Gooijer

Personal details
- Born: Thomas Justinus Arnout Marie de Bruijn; 8 October 1948 (age 77) Eindhoven, Netherlands
- Party: Democrats 66
- Spouse: Angelien Eijsink
- Children: 3
- Education: Graduate Institute of International and Development Studies; King's College London (MA); Utrecht University (LLM)
- Occupation: Diplomat; civil servant; politician

Thomas Justinus Arnout Marie de Bruijn (Dutch pronunciation: [ˈtɔm də ˈbrœyn]; born 8 October 1948) is a Dutch diplomat, civil servant and politician who served as Minister for Foreign Trade and Development Cooperation in the third Rutte cabinet from 10 August 2021 to 10 January 2022. He is a member of the social-liberal Democrats 66 (D66) party.

After studying political science and Dutch law, De Bruijn started working at the Ministry of Foreign Affairs. He rose through its ranks and served as the Dutch permanent representative to the European Union in the years 2003–2011. De Bruijn then worked for the Council of State and was appointed The Hague's alderman for finance, traffic, transport and the environment in 2014. His term ended four years later after he had also served as acting mayor for 17 days in 2017.

De Bruijn was appointed Minister for Foreign Trade and Development Cooperation in the demissionary cabinet in August 2021, replacing Sigrid Kaag. When Kaag resigned as Minister of Foreign Affairs the following month, De Bruijn took over the post in an acting capacity until the appointment of Ben Knapen.

== Early life and education ==
De Bruijn was born on 8 October 1948 in the North Brabant city of Eindhoven in a Catholic family. He has four older siblings, and his father died when De Bruijn was thirteen years old. He attended the Eindhoven secondary school Sint-Joris Lyceum in the years 1961–66 and subsequently went to the St. Thomascollege, a boarding school in Venlo, completing his secondary education in 1968.

He studied political science at the Graduate Institute of International and Development Studies in Geneva, Switzerland until 1973 and subsequently pursued a Master of Arts degree in war studies at King's College, part of the University of London. After graduating in 1974, De Bruijn studied Dutch law at Utrecht University, obtaining his degree in 1977.

== Career ==
=== 1977–2011: Government and diplomatic career ===
After completing his studies, De Bruijn took a job at the Ministry of Foreign Affairs, working at its treaty department. He switched to the ministry's international organizations department in 1981 and became Head of the General Integration Affairs Section at the European integration department three years later. In 1988, De Bruijn became the first secretary of the Dutch permanent representation to the United Nations in Geneva. He returned to the European integration department another four years later, serving as its deputy director. He was promoted to director in 1994, and he became the Director-General for European Cooperation in 1998. In his years at the Ministry of Foreign Affairs, he worked behind the scenes on the United Nations Convention on the Law of the Sea (1982) and the Treaty of Amsterdam (1997).

De Bruijn was appointed Dutch permanent representative to the European Union in January 2003, succeeding Ben Bot, who had become the Minister of Foreign Affairs. While in that position, De Bruijn was involved in the drafting of the Treaty establishing a Constitution for Europe (2004), which was later rejected by the Netherlands in a referendum, as a deputy government representative as well as in the drafting of the Treaty of Lisbon (2007) and the European Union–Ukraine Association Agreement (2014). He was also on the advisory board of Nexus Institute, which studies European cultural heritage.

=== 2011–2014: Council of State ===
He left the post of permanent representative after eight years in June 2011 to serve as a state councilor of the advisory division of the Council of State, a governmental advisory body. De Bruijn mostly concerned himself with pensions, decentralization, and European legislation.

Starting in early 2012, he was simultaneously a special advisor to the European Commission's Task Force for Greece, which provided assistance to Greece in reforming its government during the country's government-debt crisis. De Bruijn's focus was on eliminating corruption. Furthermore, he served as a guest lecturer at Leiden University, and he chaired both the advisory board of ProDemos, which educates the public about democracy and the rule of law, and the executive board of Europa decentraal, which provides information about European legislation to local and regional governments.

De Bruijn stepped down from the Council of State and from his secondary positions when he became an alderman in The Hague in 2014.

=== 2014–2019: Local politics ===
==== Coalition formation and term as alderman ====
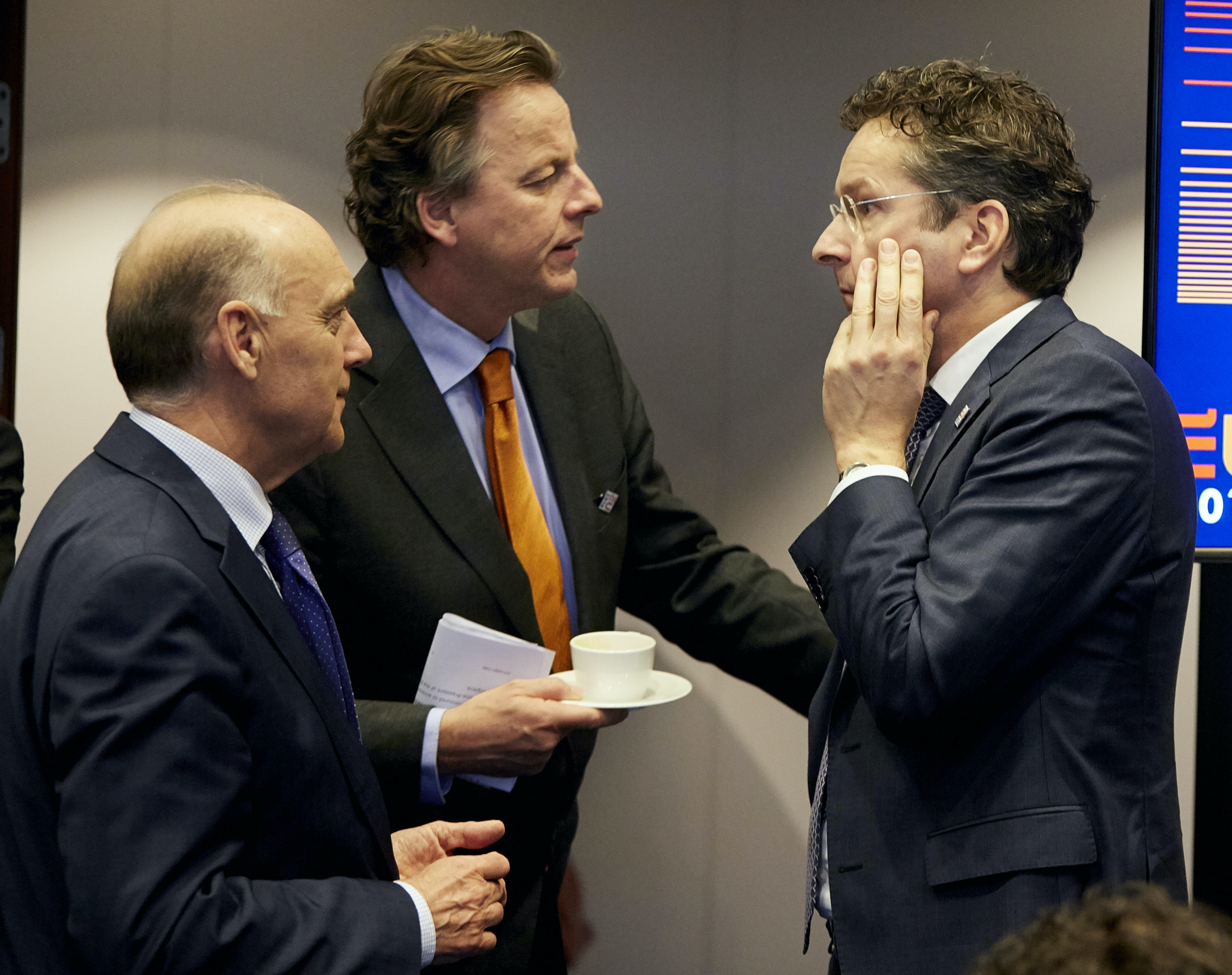
De Bruijn (left) talking to Bert Koenders (middle) and Jeroen Dijsselbloem (right) at a 2016 European conference

In the wake of the 2014 municipal election in The Hague, De Bruijn was chosen as the formateur to create a coalition government for the municipality. D66 had received a plurality of votes in the election, and De Bruijn was appointed nearly four weeks after scout Han Polman had published his report about possible coalitions. The fact that at least five parties were required to form a coalition and disagreements about a proposed cultural center caused The Hague to be among the last municipalities to form a government after the election. De Bruijn became an alderman in the new municipal executive in June 2014, and he was responsible for finances, traffic, transportation, and the environment.

Due to legal issues, he initially wanted to discontinue the municipality's policy of lowering subsidies for organizations with managers earning more than a government minister. However, he decided against the move when the municipal council criticized it. The Council of State found the policy to be illegal in 2016, a month after De Bruijn had decided that 25 organizations would receive lower subsidies. De Bruijn subsequently advocated unsuccessfully for the laws to be changed such that local governments could restrict subsidies based on management income.

As alderman, he was also responsible for the construction of several bicycle parking garages in the city center, and he assisted ADO Den Haag, which experienced financial hardship starting in 2015. De Bruijn said that the municipality would not give financial aid to the football club, but he spoke with Wang Hui, the club's investor, who was not providing the funds he had promised. The municipality gave up its priority share in 2017 after it had refused sign off on the sixth version of ADO Den Haag's budget.

==== Acting mayor and post-aldermanship ====
On 16 February 2017 – shortly before Mayor Jozias van Aartsen stepped down – De Bruijn was appointed deputy mayor of The Hague next to his position as alderman, replacing Ingrid van Engelshoven, who was participating in the 2017 general election. De Bruijn became acting mayor upon Van Aartsen's resignation on 1 March. Pauline Krikke was sworn in as mayor on 17 March, bringing an end to De Bruijn's mayoralty.

His term as alderman ended on 7 June 2018, when the new municipal executive was installed following the 2018 municipal elections. De Bruijn had told in an interview half a year before that he did not want to continue as alderman, saying it was time for something different. He became the chair of the advisory board of the Netherlands Institute of International Relations Clingendael in March 2019 after having served as its vice chair. De Bruijn also returned as guest lecturer to Leiden University, and he held positions at Duitsland Instituut (Germany institute; supervisory board chair), Transparency International Nederland (advisory board member), and the lottery holding company Nationale Goede Doelen Loterijen (supervisory board member).

In October 2019, parties of The Hague's municipal executive lost confidence in its two Groep de Mos/Hart voor Den Haag aldermen including Richard de Mos after they had become the subjects of a corruption investigation. De Bruijn was chosen as a scout to investigate possible new coalitions. After a week, he advised Groep de Mos/Hart voor Den Haag to be replaced by the Christian Democratic Appeal and the Labour Party. De Bruijn subsequently served as formateur; the coalition he had proposed was formed in December.

=== 2021–2022: Rutte cabinet ===
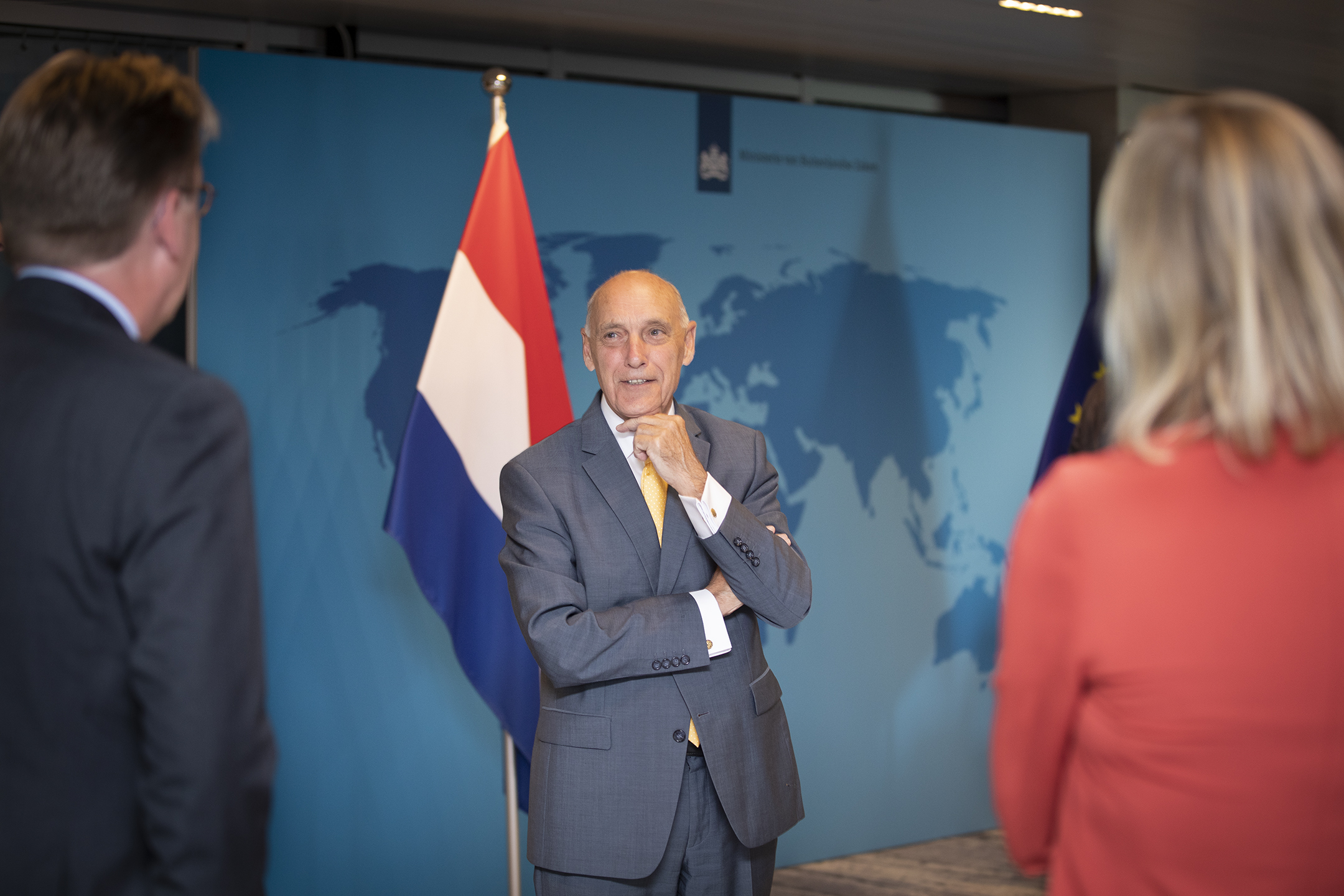
De Bruijn on his first day as minister

It was announced on 14 July 2021 that De Bruijn would join the demissionary third Rutte cabinet as Minister for Foreign Trade and Development Cooperation, replacing D66's political leader Sigrid Kaag. De Bruijn took over the post, as Kaag had simultaneously been serving as Minister of Foreign Affairs since May. He was sworn into office on 10 August by King Willem-Alexander at palace Huis ten Bosch after he had left his other positions.

Kaag announced her resignation as Minister of Foreign Affairs on 16 September after the House of Representatives had adopted a censure motion because of her handling of evacuations from Afghanistan following the fall of Kabul. De Bruijn took over her duties the following day as acting minister, while the VVD started looking for a permanent successor. De Bruijn's term ended a week later on 24 September, when Ben Knapen (CDA) was sworn in as Kaag's replacement.

He attended the 2021 United Nations Climate Change Conference (COP26) in Glasgow, where he signed an agreement to halt government financing for foreign fossil fuel projects. The cabinet had initially refused to join it. De Bruijn also started drafting legislation to oblige companies to adhere to corporate social responsibility principles in December 2021 after a similar proposal by the European Commission had been postponed. His term ended on 10 January 2022, when the fourth Rutte cabinet was sworn in, and he was succeeded by Liesje Schreinemacher. De Bruijn subsequently retired and returned as chair of the supervisory board of the Duitsland Instituut. He also became chair of the advisory council of Transparency International Nederland in July 2022, having been a member before. A book called Hoogmoed en onmacht: Geopolitiek en de Europese Unie (Haughtiness and powerlessness: Geopolitics and the European Union) by De Bruijn was published in 2024.

== Personal life ==
De Bruijn lived in The Hague while a minister, and he is married to Angelien Eijsink, a former member of the House of Representatives of the Labour Party. He has three children with a previous partner. De Bruijn started playing hockey in his youth and has played at HC Klein Zwitserland. He also enjoys cycling.

== Decorations ==
- Order of Merit of the Republic of Poland
  - Knight's Cross (18 June 2014)

Political offices
Preceded by Sigrid Kaag	Minister of Foreign Affairs; Acting; 2021	Succeeded by Ben Knapen
Preceded by Sigrid Kaag	Minister for Foreign Trade and Development Cooperation; 2021–2022	Succeeded by Liesje Schreinemacher
