= Sigrid Kaag =

Dutch politician, humanitarian and diplomat (born 1961)

Her Excellency Sigrid Kaag
- Kaag in 2023

United Nations Special Coordinator for the Middle East Peace Process ad interim
- In office 17 January 2025 – 1 July 2025
- Secretary-General: António Guterres
- Preceded by: Tor Wennesland

United Nations Senior Humanitarian and Reconstruction Coordinator for Gaza
- In office 8 January 2024 – March 2025
- Secretary-General: António Guterres
- Preceded by: Position established

First Deputy Prime Minister of the Netherlands
- In office 10 January 2022 – 8 January 2024
- Prime Minister: Mark Rutte
- Preceded by: Hugo de Jonge
- Succeeded by: Rob Jetten

Leader of the Democrats 66
- In office 4 September 2020 – 12 August 2023
- Preceded by: Alexander Pechtold
- Succeeded by: Rob Jetten
Ministerial offices 2017‍–‍2024
Minister of Finance
In office 10 January 2022 – 8 January 2024
Prime Minister	Mark Rutte
Preceded by	Wopke Hoekstra
Succeeded by	Rob Jetten (acting)
Minister of Foreign Affairs
In office 25 May 2021 – 17 September 2021
Prime Minister	Mark Rutte
Preceded by	Stef Blok
Succeeded by	Tom de Bruijn (acting)
Acting; 13 February 2018 – 7 March 2018
Prime Minister	Mark Rutte
Preceded by	Halbe Zijlstra
Succeeded by	Stef Blok
Minister for Foreign Trade and Development Cooperation
In office 26 October 2017 – 10 August 2021
Prime Minister	Mark Rutte
Preceded by	Lilianne Ploumen
Succeeded by	Tom de Bruijn
House of Representatives offices 2021‍–‍2023
Member of the House of Representatives
In office 31 March 2021 – 10 January 2022
Leader of Democrats 66 in the House of Representatives
In office 28 September 2021 – 10 January 2022
Preceded by	Rob Jetten
Succeeded by	Jan Paternotte
In office 18 March 2021 – 25 May 2021
Preceded by	Rob Jetten
Succeeded by	Rob Jetten
United Nations positions 2013‍–‍2017
United Nations Special Coordinator for Lebanon
In office 17 January 2015 – 26 October 2017
Secretary-General	Ban Ki-moon; António Guterres
Preceded by	Derek Plumbly
Succeeded by	Pernille Dahler Kardel (acting); Ján Kubiš
United Nations Special Coordinator for Syria
In office 16 October 2013 – 30 September 2014
Secretary-General	Ban Ki-moon
Preceded by	Position established
Succeeded by	Position abolished

Personal details
- Born: Sigrid Agnes Maria Kaag; 2 November 1961 (age 64) Rijswijk, Netherlands
- Party: Democrats 66
- Spouse: Anis al-Qaq (m. 1993)
- Children: 4
- Education: Utrecht University; American University in Cairo (BA); St Antony's College, Oxford (MPhil); University of Exeter (MA)
- Occupation: Politician; humanitarian; diplomat

Sigrid Agnes Maria Kaag (Dutch: [ˈsiɣrɪt ˈɑxnɛs maːˈrijaː ˈkaːx]; born 2 November 1961) is a Dutch politician, diplomat and former party leader. She served as First Deputy Prime Minister of the Netherlands and Minister of Finance, becoming the first woman to hold the finance portfolio.

Over a diplomatic career spanning more than two decades, Kaag has held a succession of senior United Nations posts at the Under-Secretary-General level, engaged in mediation and negotiation on some of the world's most complex security and humanitarian crises. These include Special Coordinator a.i. for the Middle East Peace Process, Senior Humanitarian and Reconstruction Coordinator for Gaza, Special Coordinator for Lebanon, and head of the OPCW-UN Joint Mission in Syria, which oversaw the elimination of Syria's declared chemical weapons programme. Following the adoption of United Nations Security Council Resolution 2803, she was announced as an independent member of the Gaza Executive Board. She is also an Associate Professor of international negotiation and governance at Sciences Po's Paris School of International Affairs.

Kaag entered Dutch politics in 2017 as Minister for Foreign Trade and Development Cooperation in the third Rutte cabinet on behalf of D66. She ascended to party leadership ahead of the 2021 general election and served concurrently as Minister of Foreign Affairs. When the fourth Rutte cabinet was formed in January 2022, Kaag became First Deputy Prime Minister and the first woman to serve as the Netherlands' finance minister.

Before entering national politics, Kaag built a diplomatic career at the United Nations spanning more than two decades. She served as Special Coordinator for Lebanon and later as head of the OPCW-UN Joint Mission in Syria, which oversaw the destruction of Syria's declared chemical weapons stockpile. Following her time in government, she returned to the UN, serving as Senior Humanitarian and Reconstruction Coordinator for Gaza in 2024 and as Special Coordinator for the Middle East Peace Process in 2025.

Kaag serves as an independent member of the Gaza Executive Board, established following the adoption of United Nations Security Council Resolution 2803. She is an Associate Professor of international negotiation and governance at Sciences Po's Paris School of International Affairs, Co-Chair of the Board of Directors of the UN Foundation, Global Chair of Education Cannot Wait, and an Independent Board Member of the European Investment Bank's Global Advisory Board.

She holds an M.Phil. in International Relations from the University of Oxford, an M.A. in Middle East Studies from the University of Exeter and a B.A. in Middle East Studies from the American University in Cairo. She is fluent in Dutch, English, Arabic, French, German and Spanish.

== Early life and education ==
Kaag was born on 2 November 1961 in Rijswijk as the second daughter of Frans Kaag and Agnes Kaag-Robben. Her father, who was a classical pianist and music teacher, was originally from Wervershoof, while her mother, a primary school teacher, was from Arnhem. The family settled in Zeist, where Kaag grew up. One of her brothers died when Kaag was six.

After completing her secondary education, she initially studied Arabic at Utrecht University, but later switched to The American University in Cairo where she obtained a B.A. degree in Middle East Studies in 1985. She subsequently obtained an M.Phil. degree in International Relations from St Antony's College, Oxford in 1987 and an M.A. degree in Middle East Studies from the University of Exeter in 1988. She also received foreign relations training at the Clingendael Institute in The Hague, and studied at the French École nationale d'administration (ENA).

== Career ==
=== Early career ===
Kaag began her professional career in 1988 as an analyst for Royal Dutch Shell in London, United Kingdom. In 1990, she started working for the Dutch Ministry of Foreign Affairs, where she was the deputy head of the department of United Nations political affairs.

=== 1994–2017: Career at the United Nations ===
Kaag has held multiple senior United Nations leadership roles at Under-Secretary-General level, focused on some of the most demanding geopolitical and humanitarian contexts of recent decades — Syria, Lebanon, and most recently Gaza.

Kaag started working for the United Nations in 1994 and held several senior positions at UNRWA, the International Organization for Migration and UNICEF.

From 2007 to May 2010, Kaag was Regional Director for Middle East and North Africa for UNICEF in Amman. In May 2010, she was appointed Assistant Secretary-General and Assistant Administrator and Director of the Bureau of External Relations and Advocacy of the United Nations Development Programme in New York City. In this capacity, she was the deputy to Helen Clark and oversaw UNDP's strategic external engagement, organization-wide communication and advocacy, as well as resource mobilization.

==== Head of the OPCW-UN Joint Mission in Syria ====
On 13 October 2013, United Nations Secretary-General Ban Ki-moon nominated Kaag to lead the OPCW-UN Joint Mission for the destruction of Syria's chemical weapons. The United Nations Security Council officially approved her nomination on 16 October. Kaag led a team of one hundred experts and was successful in eliminating Syria's declared chemical weapon stockpiles before 30 June 2014, thereby fulfilling her mandate.

==== United Nations Special Coordinator for Lebanon ====
On 1 December 2014, the United Nations Secretary-General Ban Ki-moon announced that Kaag would become the United Nations Special Coordinator for Lebanon (UNSCOL), succeeding Sir Derek Plumbly. In an extremely constrained political and security environment, Kaag successfully managed to keep dialogue channels open and prevent any escalation.

=== 2017–2024: Minister and D66 party leader ===
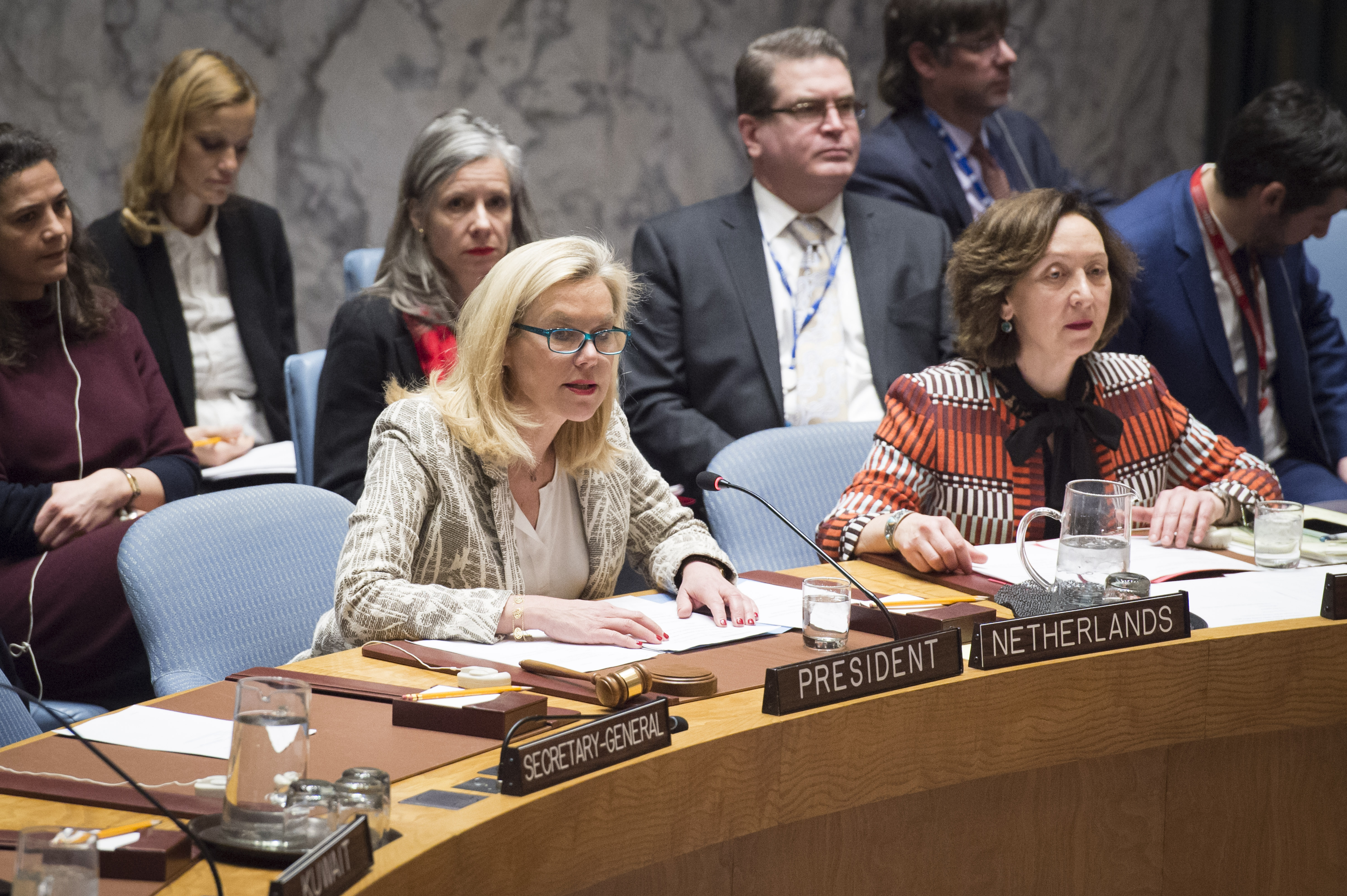
Kaag addressing the United Nations Security Council in 2018

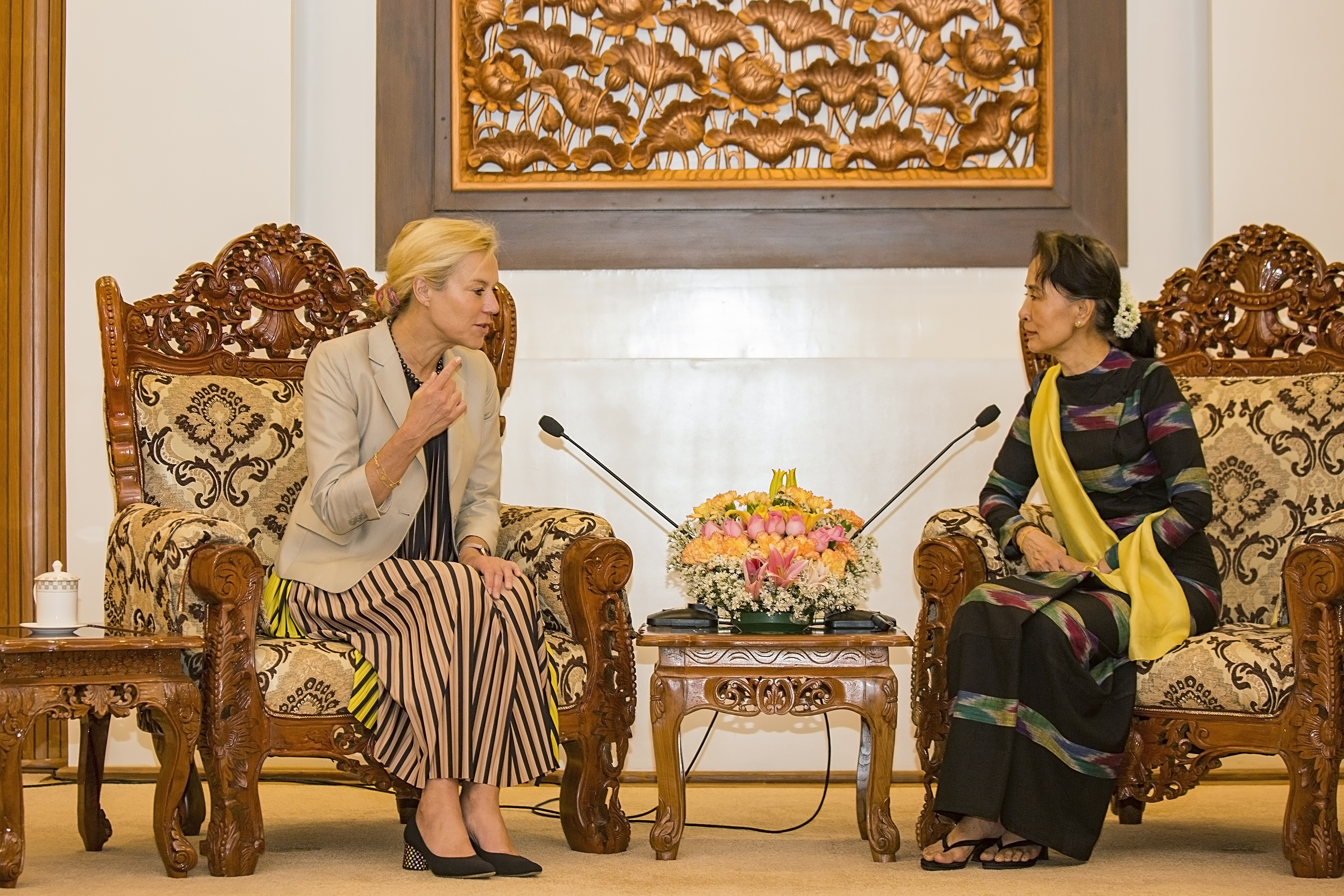
Kaag meeting with State Counsellor of Myanmar Aung San Suu Kyi in 2018

Kaag held several key senior leadership positions in successive Dutch governments, including as First Deputy Prime Minister, Minister of Finance, Minister for Foreign Trade and Development Cooperation and Minister of Foreign Affairs.

As Minister for Foreign Trade and Development Cooperation and Minister of Foreign Affairs, Kaag led international trade, investment, and diplomatic engagement across Europe, the Middle East, Africa, Asia, and the US. She worked with governments, investors, and global businesses on trade frameworks, market access, sustainable development, and infrastructure financing.

Later, as First Deputy Prime Minister and Minister of Finance, Kaag was responsible for a national budget exceeding €300 billion and the governance of more than 40 state-participated enterprises, including strategic assets across banking, aviation, rail, transport and infrastructure. She represented the Netherlands at the International Monetary Fund, the World Bank, and other international financial institutions, contributing to sovereign financial oversight, debt relief, macroeconomic stabilisation, capital allocation, and international policy.

==== Minister for Foreign Trade and Development Cooperation ====
Following the 2017 Dutch government formation, Kaag was appointed as Minister for Foreign Trade and Development Cooperation on 26 October 2017. She became the first female Minister of Foreign Affairs of the Netherlands after Halbe Zijlstra's resignation on 13 February 2018, while conserving her other cabinet position. She was replaced by Stef Blok as foreign minister on 7 March 2018.

From 2018 to 2022, Kaag served on the joint World Bank–WHO Global Preparedness Monitoring Board (GPMB), co-chaired by Elhadj As Sy and Gro Harlem Brundtland. In 2019, she joined the World Economic Forum High-Level Group on Humanitarian Investing, co-chaired by Børge Brende, Kristalina Georgieva and Peter Maurer.

==== Minister of Foreign Affairs ====
Kaag was appointed Minister of Foreign Affairs on 25 May 2021. She combined this position with her position as Minister for Foreign Trade and Development Cooperation until 10 August 2021, when Tom de Bruijn succeeded her.

On 16 September 2021, the House of Representatives passed a motion of disapproval against her for the government's handling of the evacuation of Dutch citizens and local civilian personnel from Afghanistan amid the 2021 Taliban offensive and Fall of Kabul. Kaag resigned as Minister of Foreign Affairs the next day, and was succeeded by Ben Knapen.

==== 2021 Dutch general election ====
On 21 June 2020, Kaag announced her candidacy for lijsttrekkerschap of the Democrats 66 for the 2021 general election, with the ambition of becoming the Netherlands' first female prime minister. Kajsa Ollongren and Rob Jetten were also rumoured to stand as candidates, but both refrained from doing so. Kaag won the election with 95.7% of the votes and was elected as party leader on 4 September 2020, making her the second female party leader of D66 after Els Borst in 1998. In this capacity, she led the party into the 2021 Dutch general election.

The 2021 general election was a historic success for D66. Under Kaag's leadership, D66 won an unprecedented 24 seats in the House of Representatives, thereby becoming the second-largest party after the VVD. Kaag joined the House of Representatives as the party's parliamentary leader on 31 March 2021.

==== Minister of Finance ====
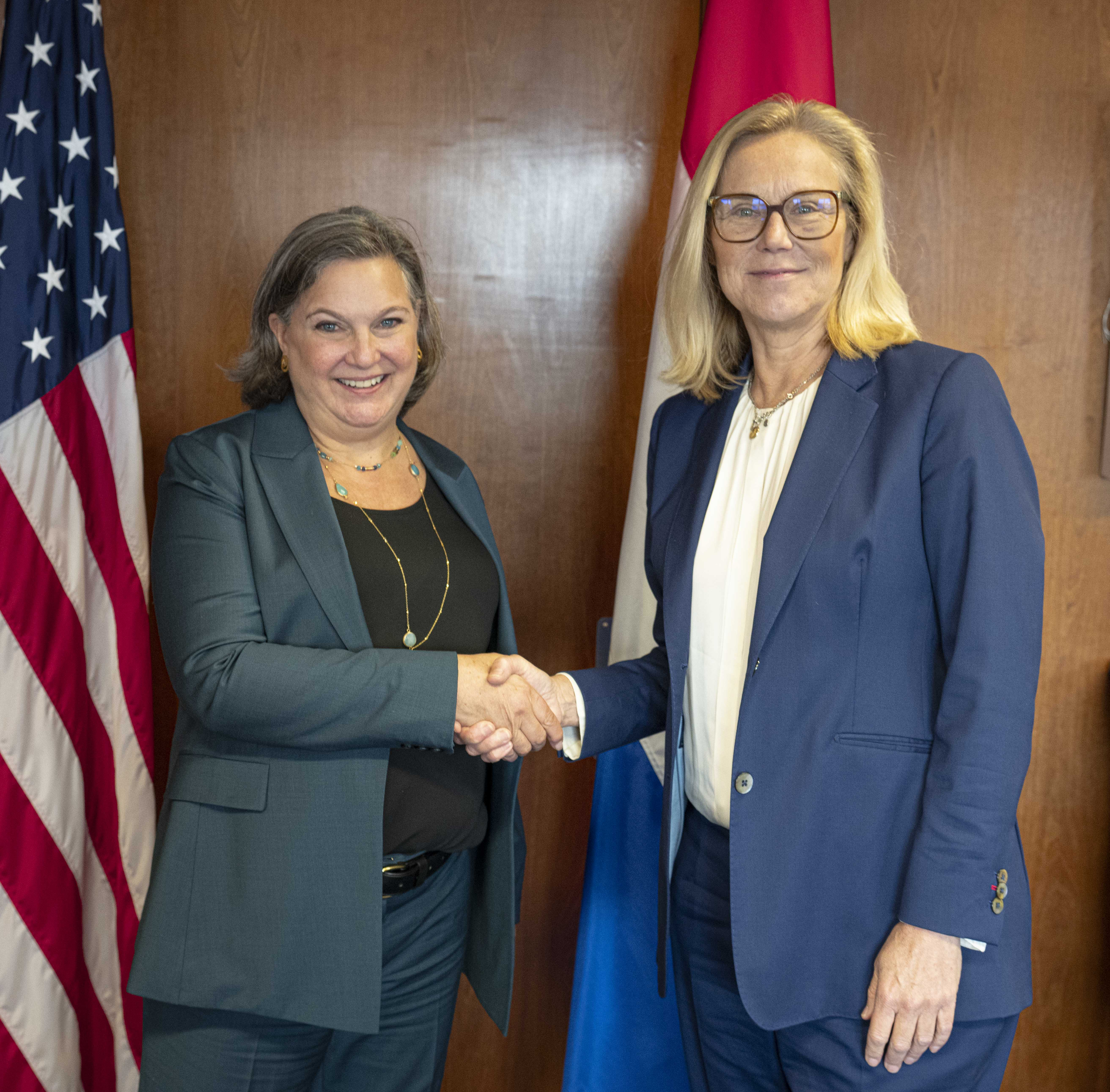
Kaag meeting with acting United States Deputy Secretary of State, Victoria Nuland, in 2023

When the fourth Rutte cabinet was formed in January 2022, Kaag became First Deputy Prime Minister and Minister of Finance.

Amid high inflation, rising interest rates and an energy crisis triggered by the Russian invasion of Ukraine, Kaag managed to sustain growth while enhancing financial resilience and protecting the Dutch economy and consumers. During her tenure, the Netherlands achieved a historic low in national debt with a budget deficit of just 0.3% of GDP, while government debt stood at 46.5% of GDP - well below the EU's 60% debt ceiling.

On 12 July 2023, five days after the collapse of the fourth Rutte cabinet, Kaag announced in an interview in Trouw that she would not lead D66 into the 2023 general election, due to the impact of the "hate, intimidation and threats" her family was receiving. She stopped as minister before a new cabinet was formed. Kaag was named an honorary member of D66 at a November 2024 party convention.

=== 2024–present: Return to diplomacy ===
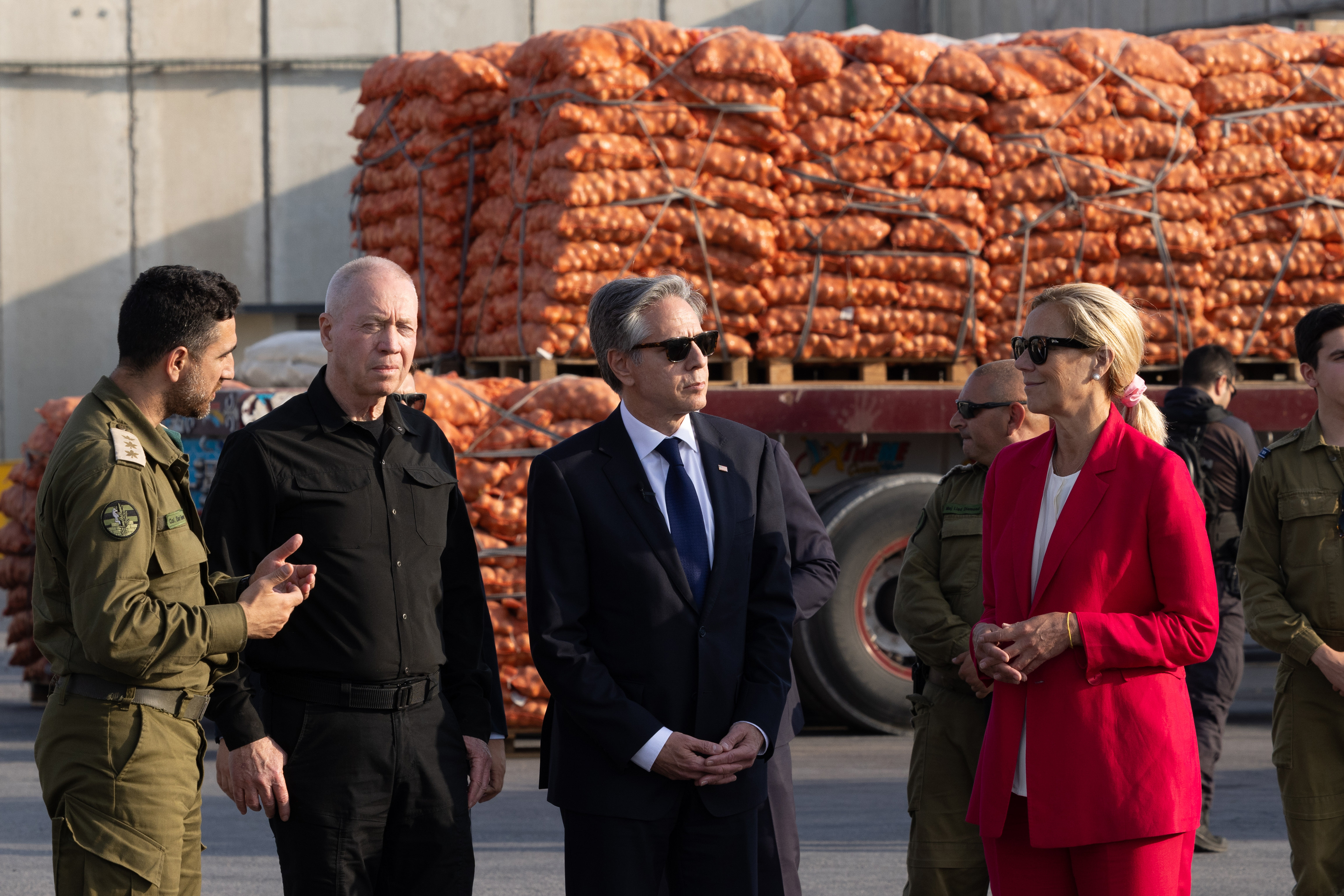
Elad Goren, Yoav Galant, Antony Blinken and Sigrid Kaag in Kerem Shalom border crossing, May 2024.

On 8 January 2024, Kaag became UN Under-Secretary-General and Senior Humanitarian and Reconstruction Coordinator for Gaza. United Nations Security Council Resolution 2720 tasked the Coordinator with facilitating, coordinating, verifying and monitoring humanitarian deliveries into the Strip and with establishing a UN mechanism to accelerate them. The resolution was adopted to alleviate the humanitarian crisis that ensued from the Gaza war, which had been ongoing since the 2023 October 7 attacks.

Kaag led high-stakes political negotiations and financial mobilisation in one of the world’s most complex conflicts. She managed to establish a lifeline aid supply system spanning Cyprus, Israel, Jordan and Egypt and structure long-term reconstruction financing frameworks with the EU, World Bank and other countries.

When Tor Wennesland left the United Nations, Kaag took over his position as Special Coordinator for the Middle East Peace Process (UNSCO) ad interim on 17 January 2025, days after Israel and Hamas agreed to a three-phase ceasefire deal. She held this role next to her post as Senior Humanitarian and Reconstruction Coordinator for Gaza. Kaag resigned as UNSCO on 1 July 2025.

In early 2026, she became a member of the Gaza Executive Board – an advisory body to the Board of Peace – established to support the reconstruction and governance of the Gaza Strip which was established by U.S. President Donald Trump and led by the government of the United States.

== Honours and awards ==
- 2015 – Honorary doctorate from the University of Exeter
- 2016 – Wateler Peace Prize awarded by the Carnegie Foundation
- 2024 – Honorary member of Democrats 66
- 2026 – Honorary doctorate from the University of Balamand

== Other activities ==
=== Board Memberships ===
- United Nations Foundation, Chair of the Board of Directors (since 2025)
- European Investment Bank (EIB) Global Advisory Council, Independent Member (since 2025)
- Gaza Executive Board (GEB), Independent Member (since 2026)
- Aswan Forum for Sustainable Peace and Development, Cairo International Center for Conflict Resolution, Peacekeeping and Peacebuilding (CCCPA), Member of the International Advisory Board (since 2026)
- Poznań Conflict Resolution Center, Adam Mickiewicz University in Poznań, Senior Advisor and Member of the Advisory Board (since 2026)

=== Non-profit Organizations ===
- Education Cannot Wait, Global Chair (since 2025)

=== Academic Affiliations ===
- Sciences Po Paris, Associate Professor and co-Scientific Advisor (since 2025)

== Personal life ==
Kaag is married and has four children. Her husband, Anis al-Qaq, is a dentist and a Palestinian national from Jerusalem who served as a deputy minister under Yasser Arafat in the 1990s and as the Palestinian representative to Switzerland. The couple married in Jerusalem. Kaag is a noted polyglot and speaks six languages fluently: Dutch, English, French, Spanish, German and Arabic. She was raised Catholic and has mentioned that she practices the religion without following all of its rituals.

== Electoral history ==
Electoral history of Sigrid Kaag
Year	Body	Party	Pos.	Votes	Result		Ref.
Year	Body	Party	Pos.	Votes	Party seats	Individual	Ref.
2021	House of Representatives	Democrats 66	1	1,237,897	24	Won	
2023	House of Representatives	Democrats 66	80 (Note: Kaag participated as lijstduwer.)	5,028	9	Lost	

== Notes ==
Diplomatic posts
Preceded by Derek Plumbly	United Nations Special Coordinator for Lebanon; 2015–2017	Succeeded by Pernille Dahler Kardel
Preceded by Tor Wennesland	United Nations Special Coordinator for the Middle East Peace Process; 2025-present	Succeeded by incumbent
Political offices
Preceded by Lilianne Ploumen	Minister for Foreign Trade and Development Cooperation; 2017–2021	Succeeded by Tom de Bruijn
Preceded by Halbe Zijlstra	Minister of Foreign Affairs; Acting; 2018	Succeeded by Stef Blok
Preceded by Stef Blok	Minister of Foreign Affairs; 2021	Succeeded by Tom de Bruijn; Acting
Preceded by Hugo de Jonge	First Deputy Prime Minister of the Netherlands; 2022–2024	Succeeded by Rob Jetten
Preceded by Wopke Hoekstra	Minister of Finance; 2022–2024	Succeeded by Rob Jetten; Acting
Party political offices
Preceded by Alexander Pechtold	Leader of the Democrats 66; 2020–2023	Succeeded by Rob Jetten
