= Al-Qaq =

Al-Qaq is a Palestinian surname. Notable people with the surname include:

- Ahmad Al-Qaq (born 2002), Palestinian footballer
- Anis al-Qaq (born 1947), Palestinian Deputy minister, ambassador and dentist
- Stephanie Al-Qaq (born 1976), British diplomat
