= Ofer Bronchtein =

French-Israeli peace activist (1957–2026)

- עופר ברונשטיין
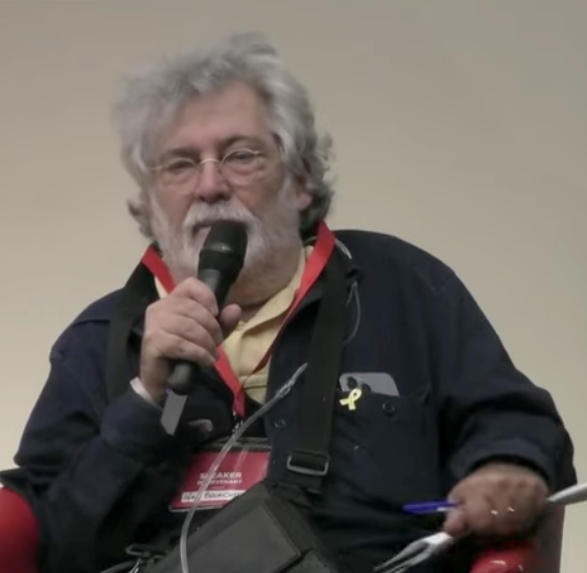
- Bronchtein in 2025
- Born: 27 March 1957; Beersheba, Israel
- Died: 18 May 2026 (aged 69); Paris, France
- Occupation: Activist

Ofer Bronchtein (Hebrew: עופר ברונשטיין; 27 March 1957 – 18 May 2026) was a French-Israeli peace activist.

== Biography ==
Born in Beersheba on 27 March 1957, Bronchtein spent his childhood in Israel before moving to France with his parents at age nine. He returned to Israel at the age of 17 and lived on a kibbutz before moving to Tel Aviv and advocating for reconciliation between Israelis and Palestinians. In 1987, he met with Mahmoud Abbas in Spain, a violation of Israeli law which prohibited citizens from interaction with members of the Palestinian Liberation Organisation; he was accordingly sentenced to 15 days in prison. During the negotiation of the Oslo Accords, he served as an advisor to Yitzhak Rabin and was a member of the Israeli delegation present at the 13 September 1993 signing in Washington, D.C.. In 1994, he organized a meeting between minister Binyamin Ben-Eliezer and Yasser Arafat. In 2002, he co-founded with Anis al-Qaq the International Forum for Peace, with the objective of promoting dialogue between Israelis and Palestinians and to implement cultural, economic, and social development projects. In 2011, Mahmoud Abbas presented him with a Palestinian passport in recognition of his efforts on behalf of peace. Because of his closeness to Palestinian leaders, he was subject to threats of violence by groups such as the French section of the Jewish Defense League. In July 2020, he was appointed a special envoy to a French taskforce for peace in the Levant by Emmanuel Macron. Following the onset of the Gaza war, he served as Macron's special envoy to the Middle East.

Bronchtein died of complications from chronic obstructive pulmonary disease in Paris on 18 May 2026, at the age of 69. In his last months, the disease had left him requiring use of a wheelchair.
