= Robert Serry =

Dutch diplomat

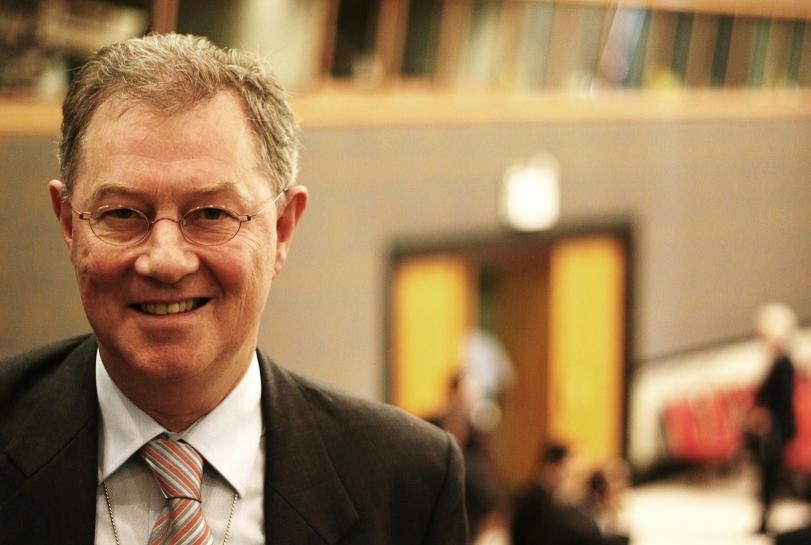
Robert H. Serry at the UN Security Council, New York City (December 2009).

Robert H. Serry (born August 29, 1950 in Kolkata) is a Dutch diplomat who served as the United Nations Special Coordinator for the Middle East Peace Process and the UN Secretary-General’s Personal Representative to the Palestine Liberation Organization and the Palestinian Authority from 2007 to 2015.

A career diplomat, Serry has served in a variety of diplomatic positions for his country's foreign service.

== Biography ==
While in the Netherlands, he led the Middle East Division of the Dutch Ministry of Foreign Affairs. He participated in the events leading to the Madrid Middle East Peace Conference of 1991.

He has been posted to Moscow and New York (United Nations), and served as the first Ambassador of Netherlands to Kyiv, Ukraine between 1992 and 1996. Following his Ukrainian posting, Serry wrote a book about his experiences as an Ambassador there, titled Standplaats Kiev, available in the Dutch and Ukrainian languages.

Between 2001 and 2005, Serry served as the Deputy Assistant Secretary-General for Crisis Management and Operations at the North Atlantic Treaty Organization (NATO). He was responsible's for NATO's civilian crisis management policy and coordination, including NATO operations in the Balkans and Afghanistan.

Serry was the Ambassador of Netherlands to Ireland until 2007, when he was appointed as the Special Coordinator for Middle East Peace Process, Personal Representative of the Secretary General to the Palestine Liberation Organization and the Palestinian Authority. In this capacity, Serry was also the personal envoy of the Secretary General to the Quartet. Following his UN posting, Serry wrote a book, titled "The Endless Quest for Israeli-Palestinian Peace: A Reflection from No Man's Land"

In early March 2014, Serry was sent to Crimea, Ukraine, to mediate the conflict between Russia and Ukraine, where on March 5th he was detained by "unknown gunmen," Russian soldiers sent under the Annexation of Crimea by the Russian Federation, where he refused to cooperate with gunmen who sought to take him to the airport. He was forced to abandon his mission.

In 2018, Serry co-founded a non-profit foundation, OpenDoorUkraine.nl, whose purpose was to promote Ukraine and Ukrainian culture and to orgaise cultural and artistic events, such as Ukrainian ballet performances, for the Dutch public. Since the start of the Russo-Ukrainian war (2022–present), however, the organization has focused on early recovery and reconstruction efforts in Ukraine. Serry currently serves as the Chairman of the Board of the foundation.

Most recently, Serry wrote a book, titled "Nog is Oekraïne niet verloren" (Amsterdam, 2026), "Ukraine is not yet lost" - in reference to the opening words of the Ukrainian anthem. The book is a diplomatic memoir in which Serry reflects on his personal diplomatic experience of key events in Ukraine's recent history.

== Education and personal ==
He obtained his degree in political science from the University of Amsterdam.

Serry is married and has three children.

== Works ==
- Standplaats Kiev (1997)
- The Endless Quest for Israeli-Palestinian Peace (2017)
- Nog is Oekraïne niet verloren (2026)

Diplomatic posts
Preceded by Michael Williams	UN Special Coordinator for the Middle East Peace Process; December 2007-February 2015	Succeeded by Nickolay Mladenov
