= Nickolay Mladenov =

Bulgarian politician

Nikolay Mladenov
- Николай Младенов
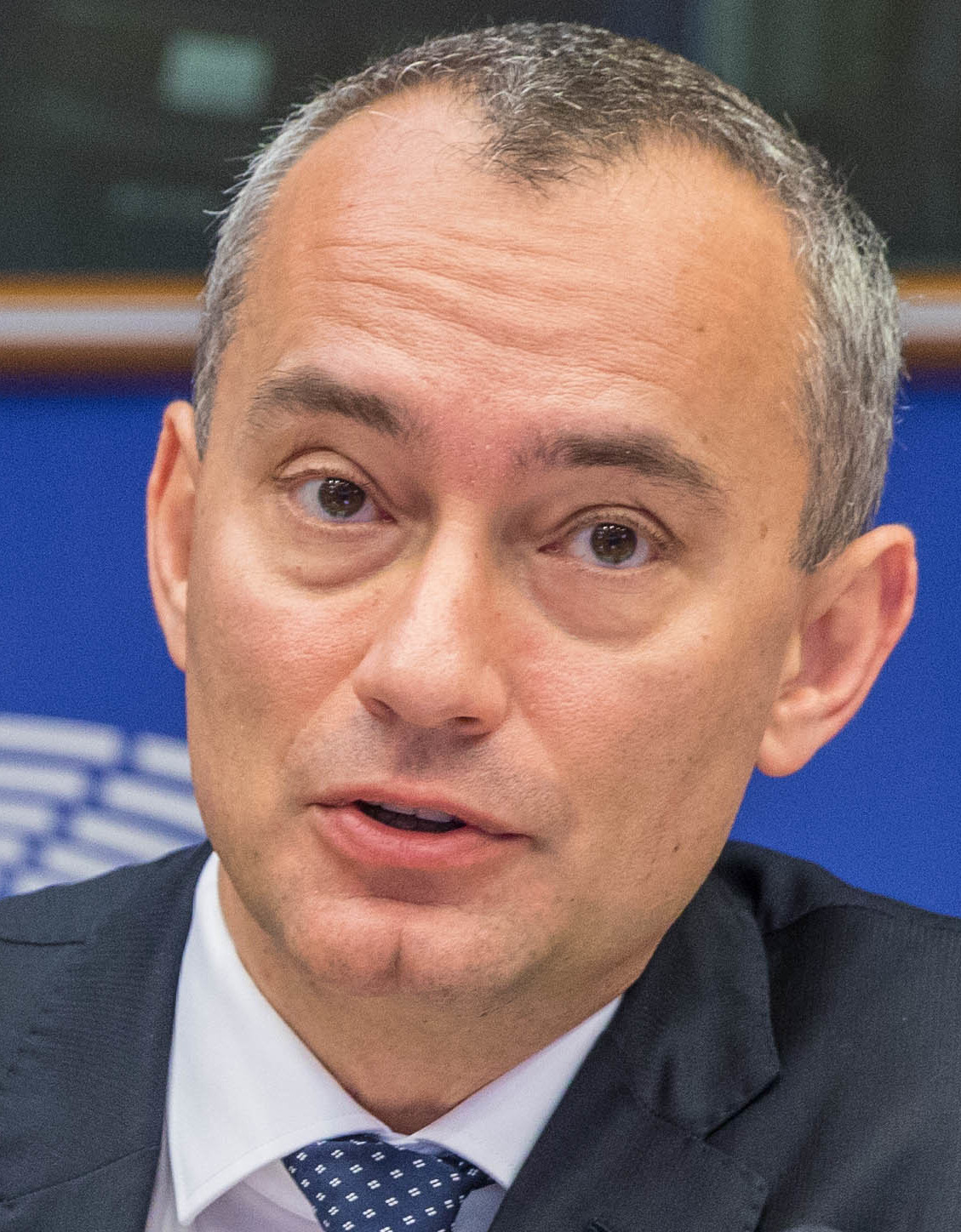
- Mladenov in 2020

High Representative for Gaza
- Incumbent
- Assumed office 16 January 2026

UN Special Coordinator for the Middle East Peace Process
- In office 5 February 2015 – 31 December 2020
- Preceded by: Robert Serry
- Succeeded by: Tor Wennesland

UN Special Representative for the United Nations Assistance Mission for Iraq
- In office 2 August 2013 – 5 February 2015
- Preceded by: Martin Kobler
- Succeeded by: Ján Kubiš

Minister of Foreign Affairs of Bulgaria
- In office 27 January 2010 – 13 March 2013
- Preceded by: Rumiana Jeleva
- Succeeded by: Marin Raykov

Minister of Defence of Bulgaria
- In office 27 July 2009 – 27 January 2010
- Preceded by: Nikolai Tsonev
- Succeeded by: Anyu Angelov

Member of the European Parliament for Bulgaria
- In office 2007–2009
- Preceded by: Position established
- Succeeded by: Iliana Ivanova

Personal details
- Born: Nikolay Evtimov Mladenov; 5 May 1972 (age 54) Sofia, Bulgaria
- Citizenship: Bulgarian
- Party: GERB
- Spouse: Gergana Mladenova
- Children: 3
- Education: University of National and World Economy; King's College London

Nikolay Evtimov Mladenov (Bulgarian: Николай Евтимов Младенов; born 5 May 1972) is a Bulgarian politician and diplomat, currently serving as High Representative for Gaza since January 2026. He served as Minister of Defense of Bulgaria from 27 July 2009 to 27 January 2010 and as the Minister of Foreign Affairs from 2010 to 2013 in the government of then Prime minister Boyko Borisov. Prior to his cabinet appointments, he was a Member of the European Parliament from 2007 to 2009, representing Bulgaria in the European People's Party Group.

He later served in senior United Nations diplomatic roles. On 2 August 2013 Mladenov was appointed as Special Representative for Iraq and Head of the United Nations Assistance Mission for Iraq (UNAMI). From 5 February 2015 until 31 December 2020, he served as UN Special Coordinator for the Middle East Peace Process. When he left that role, he received praise from both Israeli and Palestinian leaders.

Following the conclusion of his United Nations service, Mladenov assumed academic, advisory, and diplomatic training roles. Since August 2021, he has served as a Segal Distinguished Visiting Fellow at The Washington Institute for Near East Policy. As of 2022, he has served as Director-General of the Anwar Gargash Diplomatic Academy in Abu Dhabi, United Arab Emirates.

In January 2026, Israeli Prime Minister Benjamin Netanyahu announced that Mladenov had been designated as director-general of a proposed United States-led Board of Peace (also referred to as a "peace council"), a body envisioned to oversee the implementation of a Gaza cease-fire and related transitional arrangements under a peace initiative associated with U.S. President Donald Trump.

== Early life and education ==
Mladenov was born on 5 May 1972 in Sofia. In 1995, he graduated from the University of National and World Economy, majoring in international relations. The following year he obtained an MA in war studies from King's College London. His father, Evtim Mladenov, worked for the Committee for State Security (Bulgarian secret police during Communist era) and his uncle Mladen was a Bulgarian diplomat during the socialist period.

== Career ==
Between 1996 and 1998 Mladenov was program director of the Open Society Foundations in Sofia, followed by an appointment as a program coordinator in the social department of the World Bank for Bulgaria. In 1999 he founded the European Institute in Sofia and was its director until 2001. He was a member of parliament for the United Democratic Forces in the 39th National Assembly, parliamentary secretary (until March 2002), and vice chairman of the committee on European integration and the committee on foreign affairs, defense and security.

On 12 March 2002 Mladenov was elected to the national executive council of the party Union of Democratic Forces. Later he was appointed spokesman of the party. From 22 February 2004 he was the vice-president of UDF, resigning on 16 August 2005.

From 2005 to 2007 Mladenov served as a consultant to the World Bank, International Republican Institute and National Democratic Institute in Bulgaria, Afghanistan, Yemen and other Middle Eastern countries. In 2006 he worked as an adviser to parliamentary committees on defense and foreign policy and cooperation of the Iraqi Parliament.

=== Member of the European Parliament, 2007–2009 ===
Mladenov was number 3 on the candidate list of the GERB party for the European elections 2007. As a member of the European Parliament Mladenov was a member of the committees on internal market and consumer protection, foreign affairs, and the subcommittee on security and defence. He was also the first vice chairman of the parliament's delegation for relations with Iraq and member of the delegations to Israel and Afghanistan.

Mladenov is a signatory of the Prague Declaration on European Conscience and Communism.

=== Career with the United Nations, 2013–2020 ===
On 2 August 2013, Mladenov was appointed as United Nations Special Representative for Iraq and Head of the United Nations Assistance Mission for Iraq (UNAMI) by the United Nations Secretary-General Ban Ki-moon. He succeeded Martin Kobler of Germany. At the time, the country security had deteriorated as Sunni Islamist groups stepped up an insurgency against the Shi'ite-led government.

On 5 February 2015, Mladenov was appointed United Nations Special Coordinator for the Middle East Peace Process, replacing Dutch diplomat Robert Serry. As envoy, he caught flak over his bluntness. In 2016, he led efforts of the Quartet on the Middle East on issuing a report on concrete steps that could at least preserve the possibility of a two-state solution.

In late 2018, Mladenov was mentioned in news media as potential successor of Staffan de Mistura as United Nations Special Envoy for Syria.

Mladenov welcomed the Israel–United Arab Emirates peace agreement, adding that it would stop Israel's annexation plans which the UN has repeatedly called for to be stopped and hoped it will restart dialogue between Israel and Palestinians.

In December 2020 the Security Council approved United Nations Secretary-General António Guterres's proposal to appoint Mladenov as the new UN envoy for Libya. However, on 21 December, he withdrew from the position citing "personal and family reasons".

=== Director General for Anwar Gargash Diplomatic Academy ===
In 2021, Nickolay Mladenov was appointed the director-general of the Anwar Gargash Diplomatic Academy in Abu Dhabi. During this time, Mladenov has been a vocal proponent of the Abraham Accords, UAE's establishment of diplomatic relations with Israel.

=== High Representative for Gaza ===
In January 2026, Mladenov was appointed by the United States as High Representative for Gaza and tasked with leading the newly formed Board of Peace, an international body designed to oversee governance, reconstruction, and security coordination in the Gaza Strip following the ceasefire. Mladenov had met with Israeli Prime Minister Benjamin Netanyahu to coordinate on implementation of the board's mandate, including the second phase of the U.S.-led Gaza peace plan, and consultations reportedly involved senior representatives from the United States and European partners. In May, during a news conference in Jerusalem, Mladenov stated that Hamas must disarm but not "disappear" as a political movement in Gaza.

== Mediation and diplomatic approach ==
Drawing on his experience as a United Nations envoy in Iraq, Mladenov employed a pragmatic mediation style during his tenure as UN Special Coordinator for the Middle East Peace Process. The Israel-based foreign policy think tank Mitvim described this approach as a form of crisis-management diplomacy based on sustained engagement with Israeli, Palestinian, and regional actors.

Israeli policy institutions noted that, despite the United Nations' limited formal leverage in the conflict, Mladenov maintained working relations with Israel's political leadership. The Institute for National Security Studies (INSS) observed that his engagement was shaped by public criticism of both Israeli settlement expansion and Palestinian incitement to violence.

== Incidents and concerns ==
Mladenov was one of the two Bulgarian politicians exposed in the Pandora Papers. The leak revealed that he was the beneficial owner of an offshore company called Afron Enterprises in the Seychelles.

Mladenov denied any wrongdoing and claimed he simply founded an offshore firm to develop a consultancy practice before his involvement in the UN. However, the offshore company was founded on 9 August 2013, a week after Mladenov joined the UN as Special Representative in Iraq and Head of the UN Assistance Mission for Iraq on 2 August 2013. Prior to the Pandora papers scandal in 2021, Mr. Mladenov had not disclosed his offshore company to the UN, despite being required to do so.

== Other activities ==
- European Council on Foreign Relations (ECFR), Member

== See also ==
- List of foreign ministers in 2013
- Foreign relations of Bulgaria
- List of Bulgarians

Political offices
Preceded by Nikolai Tsonev	Minister of Defence of Bulgaria; 27 July 2009 – 27 January 2010	Succeeded by Anyu Angelov
Preceded by Rumiana Jeleva	61st Minister of Foreign Affairs of Bulgaria; 27 January 2010 – 13 March 2013	Succeeded by Marin Raykov
Diplomatic posts
Preceded by Robert Serry	UN Special Coordinator for the Middle East Peace Process; February 2015 – December 2020	Succeeded by Tor Wennesland
Preceded by Martin Kobler	UN Special Representative for the United Nations Assistance Mission for Iraq; 2013–2015	Succeeded by Ján Kubiš
