= Tor Wennesland =

Norwegian diplomat (born 1952)

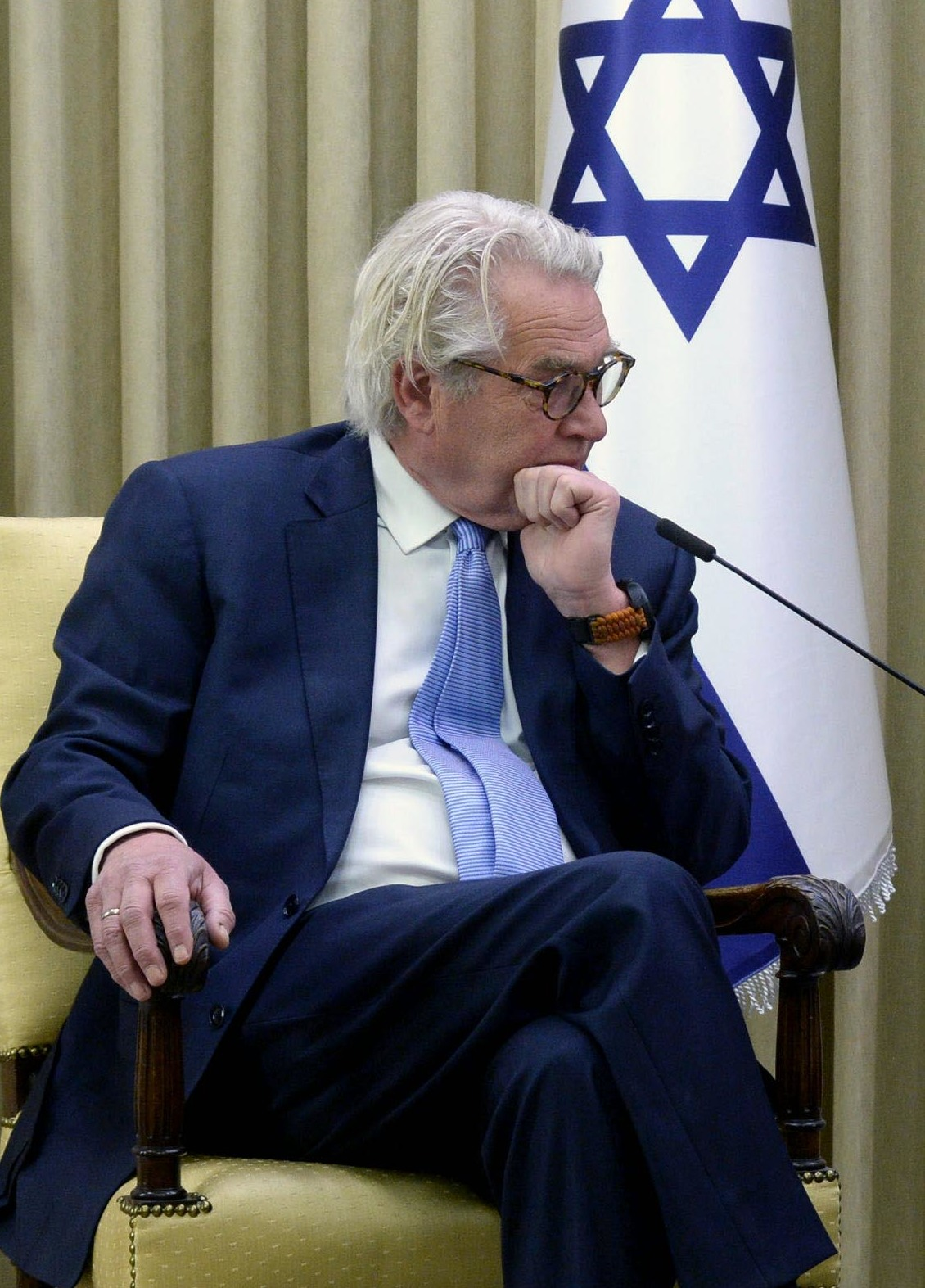
- Wennesland in 2021

UN Special Coordinator for the Middle East Peace Process
- In office 1 January 2021 – 17 January 2025
- Secretary-General: António Guterres
- Preceded by: Nickolay Mladenov
- Succeeded by: Sigrid Kaag

Personal details
- Born: 21 August 1952 (age 73)

Tor Wennesland (born 21 August 1952) is a Norwegian diplomat who served as UN Special Coordinator for the Middle East Peace Process from 2021 to 2025.

== Biography ==
Holding the cand. theol. degree, he joined the Ministry of Foreign Affairs in 1983.

He was Norway's Representative to the Palestinian Authority from 2007 to 2011 and Norway's Ambassador to Egypt and Libya from 2012 to 2015.

He served as the UN Special Coordinator for the Middle East Peace Process from 2021 to 2025, following Nickolay Mladenov. He is currently Norway's Special Representative to the Middle East Peace Process, including the responsibility for Norway's chairmanship of the Ad Hoc Liaison Committee (AHLC) for Palestine.

Diplomatic posts
Preceded by Nickolay Mladenov	UN Special Coordinator for the Middle East Peace Process; January 2021 – January 2025	Succeeded by Sigrid Kaag
