= Álvaro de Soto =

Peruvian diplomat

Álvaro de Soto Polar (born 16 March 1943) is a Peruvian diplomat. He ended a 25-year career with the United Nations in May 2007.

== Early years and family ==
He is the brother of the economist Hernando de Soto.

After attending the International School of Geneva, de Soto studied law and international relations in Lima at the University of San Marcos and in Geneva at the Graduate Institute of International Studies prior to enlisting in his country's diplomatic corps. Prior to his secondment to the United Nations, he worked for Peru's foreign ministry in Lima and at its UN missions in New York City and Geneva.

== United Nations career ==
In 1982 he joined the United Nations staff as a special adviser to Secretary-General Javier Pérez de Cuéllar. Following his appointment as the Secretary-General's Personal Representative for the Central American Peace Process, Ambassador de Soto headed the 1990–1991 negotiations that brought an end to the decade-long civil war in El Salvador.

He was a Senior Political Adviser to Secretary-General Boutros Boutros-Ghali from February 1992 to December 1994. He then served as Assistant Secretary-General for Political Affairs, in charge of the Americas, Europe, Asia, and the Pacific, from 1995 to 1999. In 1997 Secretary-General Kofi Annan chose him as his Special Envoy for Myanmar, a position he held until 1999. His legal advisor Didier Pfirter was later appointed as the Swiss Ambassador to Columbia.

=== Cyprus ===
On 1 November 1999 de Soto was selected as the Secretary-General's Special Adviser on Cyprus, with the rank of Under-Secretary-General; he held this post until the dismantling of the Special Mission to Cyprus following the April 2004 rejection of the Annan Plan for a Cypriot bizonal bicommunal federation divided along ethnic and religious lines.

=== Middle East ===
On 6 May 2005 he was appointed the United Nations Special Coordinator for the Middle East Peace Process. In May 2007 he resigned from the position. He wrote a 53-page End of Mission statement, dated 5 May, "meant only for senior UN officials", with "wording far more critical than the public pronouncements of UN diplomats". It was leaked to The Guardian and published on 13 June. De Soto has confirmed the authenticity of the Guardian text. He criticized both the Palestinian organizations Hamas and Fatah and the Israeli government, as well as the international community. He condemned the sanctions imposed by Israel, EU, and US, against Palestine after Hamas won the election. He warned "that American pressure has 'pummelled into submission' the UN's role as an impartial Middle East negotiator."

== Other activities ==
Álvaro de Soto is a Member of the Global Leadership Foundation, an organization which works to support democratic leadership, prevent and resolve conflict through mediation and promote good governance in the form of democratic institutions, open markets, human rights and the rule of law. It does so by making available, discreetly and in confidence, the experience of former leaders to today’s national leaders. It is a not-for-profit organization composed of former heads of government, senior governmental and international organization officials who work closely with Heads of Government on governance-related issues of concern to them.

Diplomatic posts
Preceded by Terje Rød-Larsen	UN Special Coordinator for the Middle East Peace Process; June 1, 2005 – May 7, 2007	Succeeded by Michael Williams
