= Anis al-Qaq =

Palestinian former dentist, politician, and ambassador

- القاق، أنيس

Deputy minister of Planning Minister of the Palestinian National Authority
- In office 1994–2003
- President: Yasser Arafat
- Preceded by: Position established

Ambassador of the Palestinian National Authority to Switzerland
- In office 2003–2009
- Succeeded by: Ibrahim Mohammad Khraishi
- President: Mahmoud Abbas

Personal details
- Born: 1 June 1947 (age 79) Silwan, Jerusalem, Mandatory Palestine
- Party: Fatah

Anis al-Qaq (Arabic: القاق، أنيس; born 1 June 1947) is a Palestinian former dentist, Palestinian Authority deputy minister and ambassador.

== Early life and career ==
Anis al-Qaq received a BSc in Dentistry from the University of Baghdad in 1971. After his graduation he opened a private clinic in Jerusalem. From 1982 to 1984 he continued his education in Buckinghamshire, UK, specializing in oral surgery.

Other activities:

- 1985–90 Chairman of the Dental Association in the West Bank.
- 1986–90 Head of the Professionals’ Union
- 1989– chairman of the Board of Trustees of the Palestinian National Theater in Jerusalem
- 1989– Executive Member, Council for Higher Education
- 1989– President of the Palestinian-Swedish Friendship Society
- 1989– Secretary General of the Health Services Council
- 1989– Board Member of the International Coordinating Committee on the Question of Palestine (ICCP)
- 1989– Member of the Coordinating Committee for NGOs on the Question of Palestine in the Occupied Palestinian Territories
- 1989– Member of the Palestinian Medical School Committee
- 2002– Co-chairperson International Forum for Peace
- 2004– Member of the editorial board of the Palestine–Israel Journal
- 2004– President of the Center for Health Services in Jerusalem

== Politics ==
Al-Qaq became Deputy Assistant to the PA Minister of Planning and International Cooperation in 1994. He became ambassador of the Palestinian National Authority to Switzerland in 2003. In 2009 he retired from politics.

In 2002 he founded with Ofer Bronchtein the International Forum for Peace which aims to promote dialogue between Israelis and Palestinians, Europeans and Mediterraneans, and implement cultural, economic and Social development projects.

== See also ==
- Education in Palestine
- Healthcare in Palestine
- Sigrid Kaag, his wife
