= Michael Williams, Baron Williams of Baglan =

The Right Honourable The Lord Williams of Baglan
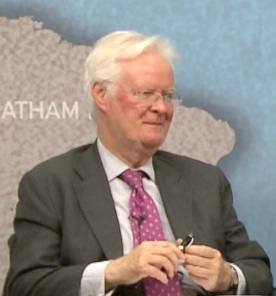
- Williams in 2012

Member of the House of Lords
- Lord Temporal
- Life peerage 23 July 2010 – 23 April 2017

Personal details
- Born: Michael Charles Williams; 11 June 1949 Bridgend, South Wales, United Kingdom
- Died: 23 April 2017 (aged 67)
- Party: Labour
- Spouse(s): Isobelle Jaques (m. 1992) Margaret Rigby (divorced)
- Relations: Emlyn Williams (father); Mildred (née Morgan) (mother)
- Children: Ben; Rhiannon (with Margaret Rigby)
- Education: University College London; SOAS, University of London

Michael Charles Williams, Baron Williams of Baglan (11 June 1949 – 23 April 2017) was a British diplomat and crossbench life peer.

== Education ==
Williams attended Sandfields Comprehensive School, Baglan, in Port Talbot. He was later to use the village name of 'Baglan' in his title on entering the House of Lords as a Labour peer in 2010.

He received bachelor's degree from University College London in 1971 and a master's degree in the Politics of Developing Studies from the School of Oriental and African Studies (SOAS), in 1973. He subsequently earned a doctorate in Politics, also from SOAS. He then lectured in politics at the University of East Anglia from 1978 to 1980.

== Career ==
Lord Williams was the United Nations Special Coordinator for Lebanon. He was appointed by United Nations Secretary-General Ban Ki-moon in August 2008. Williams previously served as UN Special Coordinator for the Middle East Peace Process and the Secretary-General's Special Adviser on the Situation in the Middle East. Prior to that, he was the Director for the Asia and the Pacific Division in the Department of Political Affairs. From 1999 to 2005, Williams was the Special Adviser to two UK Foreign Secretaries, Robin Cook (1999–2001) and Jack Straw (2001–2005).

He held a number of senior positions with the UN in the 1990s, including Director of Human Rights in the UN Transitional Administration in Cambodia (UNTAC) and Director of Information in the UN Protection Force in Former Yugoslavia (UNPROFOR). His previous experience ranged from working for the International Institute for Strategic Studies, the BBC World Service and Amnesty International. He was a member of the Executive Committee and Council of Chatham House (Royal Institute for International Affairs). He had written widely on Asian politics, international security and peacekeeping. He had been a Trustee of the BBC Trust since 2011. He had served as Chair of the Trustee Board of the British humanitarian demining charity MAG (Mines Advisory Group) since 2013.

Williams was made a life peer in the 2010 Dissolution Honours list. He was created Baron Williams of Baglan, of Neath Port Talbot in Glamorgan, on 23 July 2010 and, on being introduced into the House of Lords, took his seat on the Labour benches. He was granted a 12-month leave of absence from the House which ended in October 2011, and sat as a crossbencher.

Williams died in Britain in April 2017 aged 67.

Diplomatic posts
Preceded by Álvaro de Soto	UN Special Coordinator for the Middle East Peace Process; May–December 2007	Succeeded by Robert Serry
