= Ben Knapen =

Dutch politician

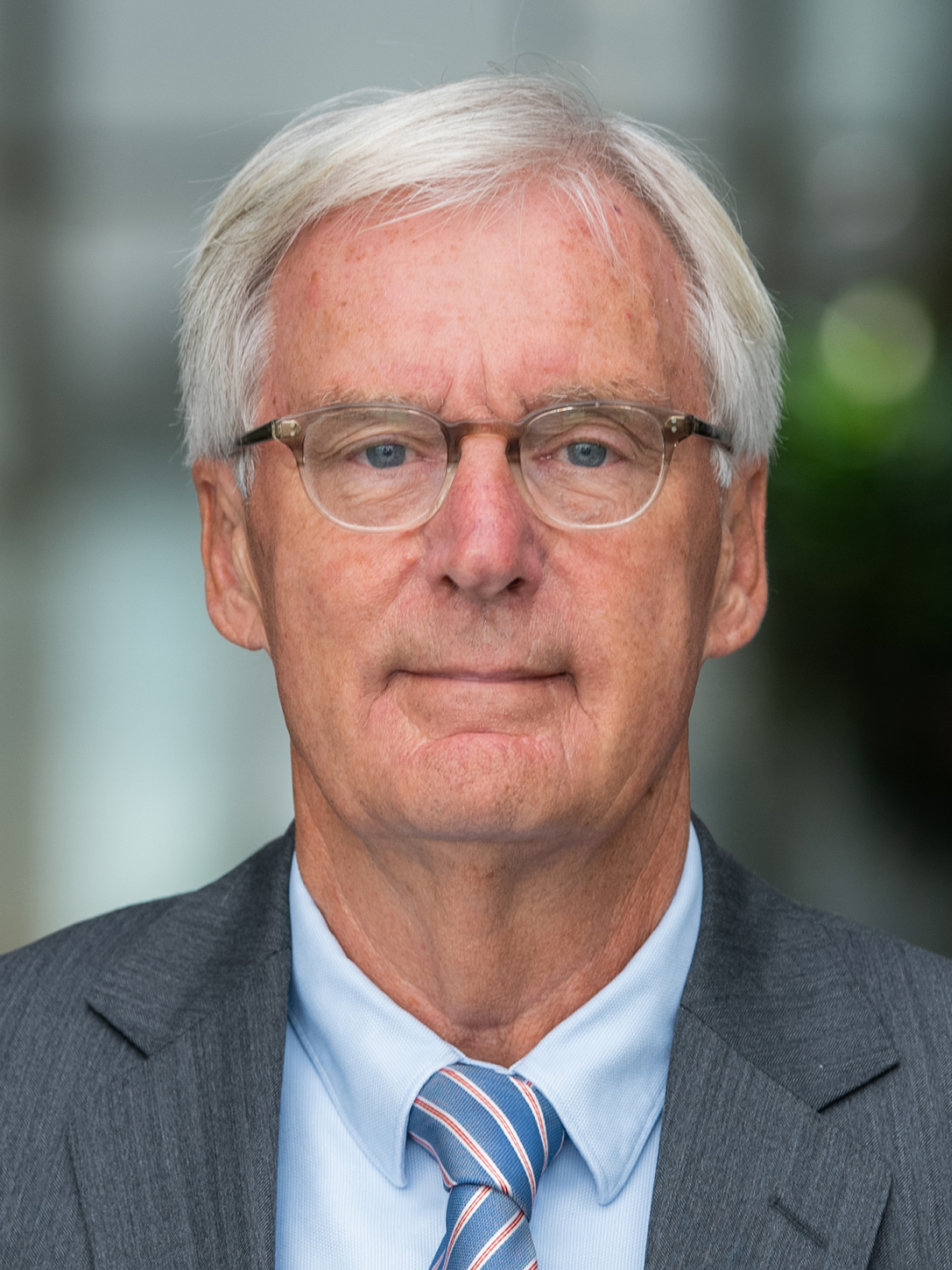
- Knapen in 2021

Minister of Foreign Affairs
- In office 24 September 2021 – 10 January 2022
- Prime Minister: Mark Rutte
- Preceded by: Tom de Bruijn (Acting)
- Succeeded by: Wopke Hoekstra

Leader of the Christian Democratic Appeal in the Senate
- In office 11 June 2019 – 24 September 2021
- Preceded by: Elco Brinkman
- Succeeded by: Joop Atsma

Senator of the Netherlands
- In office 9 June 2015 – 24 September 2021

State Secretary for Foreign Affairs
- In office 14 October 2010 – 5 November 2012
- Prime Minister: Mark Rutte
- Preceded by: Frans Timmermans
- Succeeded by: Position abolished

Personal details
- Born: Hubertus Petrus Maria Knapen; 6 January 1951 (age 75) Kaatsheuvel, Netherlands
- Party: Christian Democratic Appeal
- Education: Radboud University Nijmegen (BA, MA, PhD)

Hubertus Petrus Maria "Ben" Knapen (born 6 January 1951) is a Dutch historian and politician who served as Minister of Foreign Affairs from 24 September 2021 to 10 January 2022. A member of the Christian Democratic Appeal (CDA), he previously was State Secretary for Foreign Affairs from 2010 to 2012 and parliamentary leader in the Senate from 2019 to 2021.

== Career ==
Knapen was the State Secretary for Foreign Affairs in the first Rutte cabinet, serving from 14 October 2010 to 5 November 2012. His portfolio comprised European Union matters, as well as international aid. Then he was on the advisory board of OMFIF where he was regularly involved in meetings regarding the financial and monetary system.

== Other activities ==
- Bilderberg Group, attendee of the 1991 meeting in Baden-Baden
- African Development Bank (AfDB), Ex-Officio Member of the Board of Governors (2010–2012)

== Decorations ==
- Netherlands: Knight of the Order of Orange-Nassau (7 December 2012)
- Norway: Grand Cross of the Royal Norwegian Order of Merit (9 September 2021)

Party political offices
Preceded by Elco Brinkman	Leader of the Christian Democratic Appeal in the Senate; 2019–present	Incumbent
Political offices
Preceded by Frans Timmermans	State Secretary for Foreign Affairs; 2010–2012	Vacant
Preceded by Tom de Bruijn (acting)	Minister of Foreign Affairs; 2021–2022	Succeeded by Wopke Hoekstra
