= Ibrahim Mohammad Khraishi =

Palestinian diplomat

- إبراهيم محمد خريشة
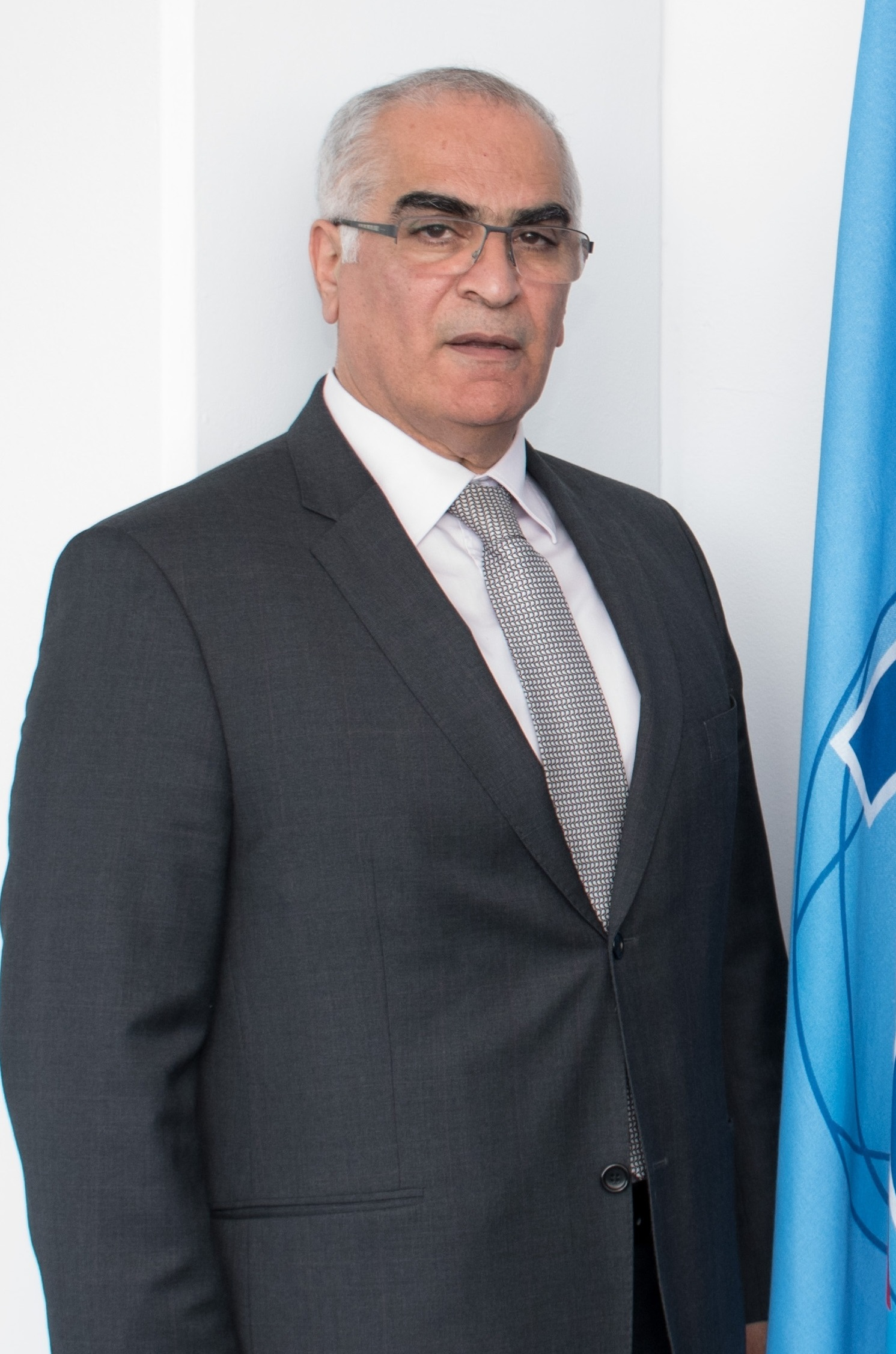
- Khraishi in 2016

Permanent Observer of Palestine to the United Nations at Geneva
- Incumbent
- Assumed office 2008

Permanent Observer of Palestine to the international organizations in Geneva
- Incumbent
- Assumed office 2008

Palestinian Ambassador to Switzerland
- Incumbent
- Assumed office 2010

Personal details
- Born: 26 March 1956 (age 69) Tulkarm, Palestine
- Occupation: Diplomat; Politician

Ibrahim Mohammad Khraishi (Arabic: إبراهيم محمد خريشة, romanized: Ibrāhīm Muḥammad Khurayshah; born 1956) is a Palestinian politician and diplomat. He is Deputy Foreign Affairs Minister of the Palestinian National Authority, Palestine's ambassador to Switzerland, and Permanent Observer representing Palestine for the United Nations at Geneva.

== Early years ==
Khraishi was born in Tulkarm, Palestine on 26 March 1956. He has a degree in medicine from Belgrade University and in international law from the International Center for Human Rights in Strasbourg.

== Political and diplomatic life ==
In 1990 he became chairman of the General Union of Palestinian Students. Five years later he was appointed head of the Final Status Negotiations Department of the Palestine Liberation Organization. He was elected to the Palestinian Central Council in 1997 and to the Fatah Revolutionary Council in 2004. He has served as Director of International Affairs in the Palestinian Foreign Ministry.

Khraishi is a member of the Palestinian Coalition for Peace and Deputy Foreign Affairs Minister of the Palestinian National Authority. In 2008 he became a Permanent Observer representing Palestine for the United Nations and, in 2010, Palestine's ambassador to Switzerland.

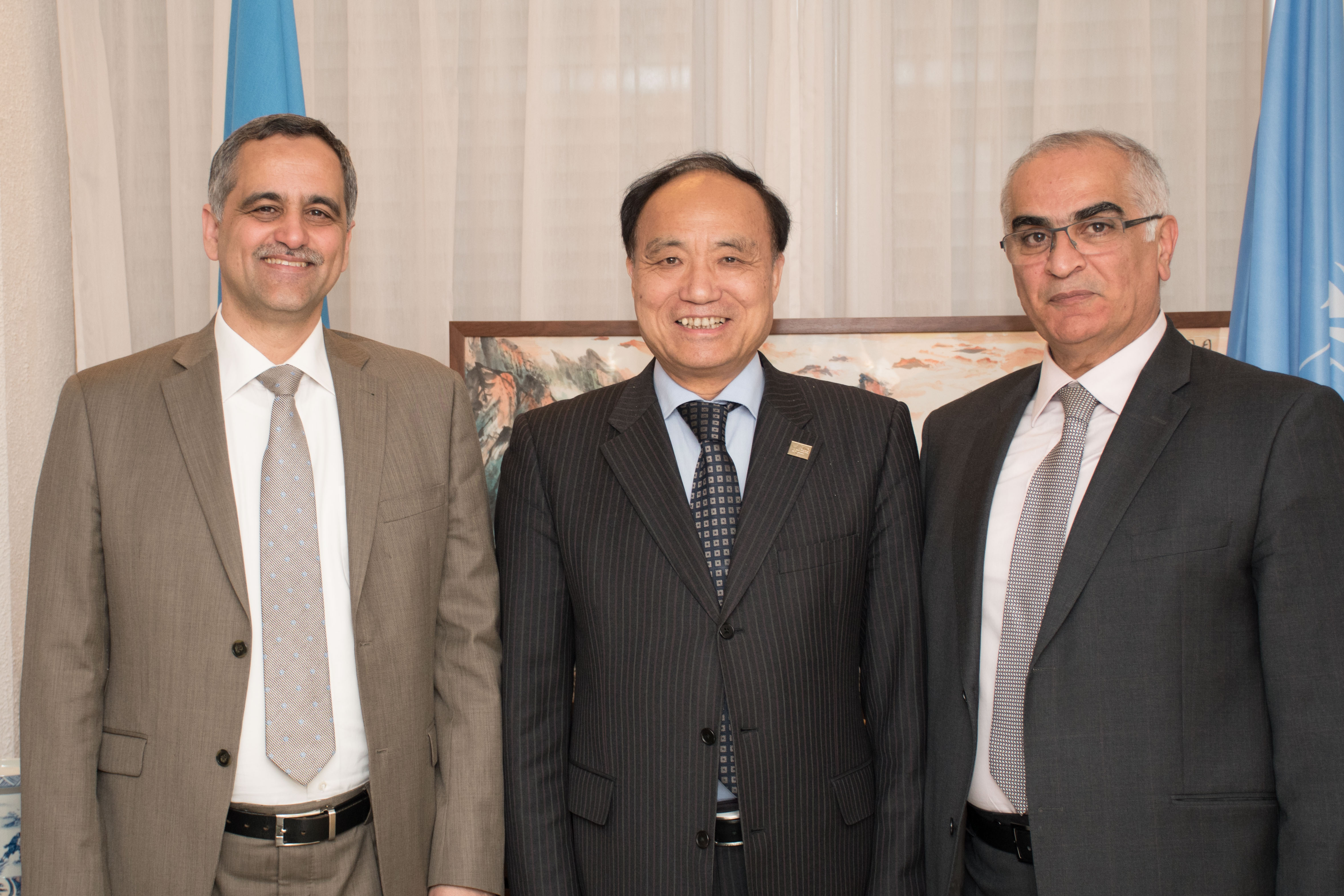
Ibrahim Khraishi (right)
