= Angelien Eijsink =

Dutch politician (born 1960)

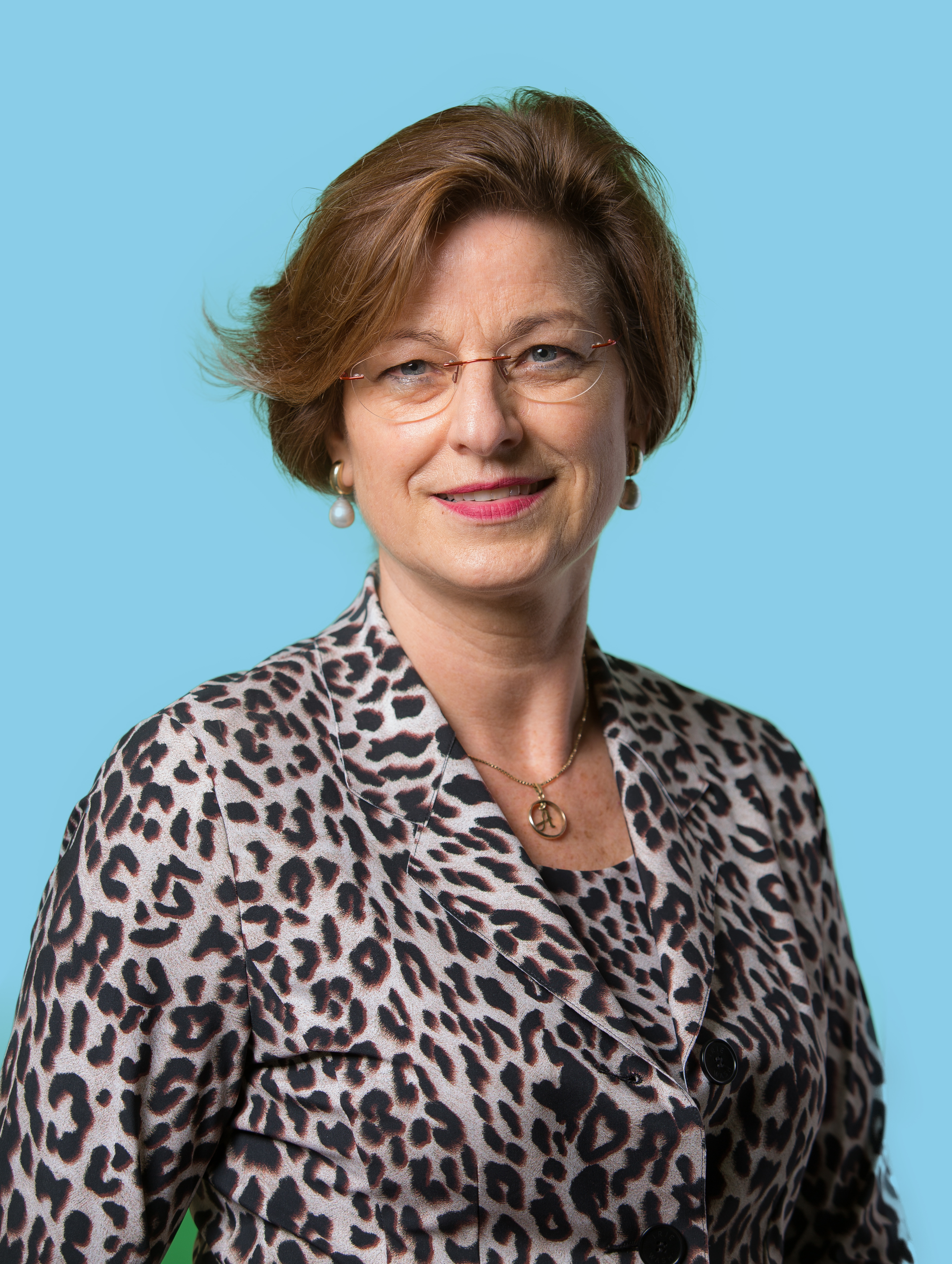
- Eijsink in 2016

Member of the House of Representatives
- In office 30 January 2003 – 23 March 2017

Personal details
- Born: 1 April 1960 (age 66) St. Isidorushoeve
- Party: Labour Party
- Occupation: Politician

Voice of Angelien Eijsink
recorded September 2014

Angeline Maria Catharina (Angelien) Eijsink (born 1 April 1960) is a Dutch politician and former civil servant and educator. As a member of the Labour Party (Partij van de Arbeid) she was an MP between 30 January 2003 and 23 March 2017. She focused on matters of the Dutch defense.

== Life and career ==
=== Career diplomat, 1995–2003 ===
From 1995, Eijsink was a career diplomat at the Ministry of Foreign Affairs. Among other positions, she held the position of Head of the Southern Africa Division of the Sub-Saharan Africa Department.

=== Member of Parliament, 2003–2017 ===
Eijsink was a Member of the Dutch House of Representatives since the 2003 national elections. Since 2013, she served as chairwoman of the Committee on Foreign Affairs. She also was a member of the committees on Defence, European Affairs, Public Expenditure, Foreign Trade and Development Cooperation, Housing and the Central Government Sector, and Kingdom Relations.

== Other activities ==
- Netherlands Atlantic Association, Member of the Board of Directors
- Association of Active Veterans, Member of the Board of Recommendation of the
