= United Nations Special Coordinator for the Middle East Peace Process =

Representative of the UN Secretary-General

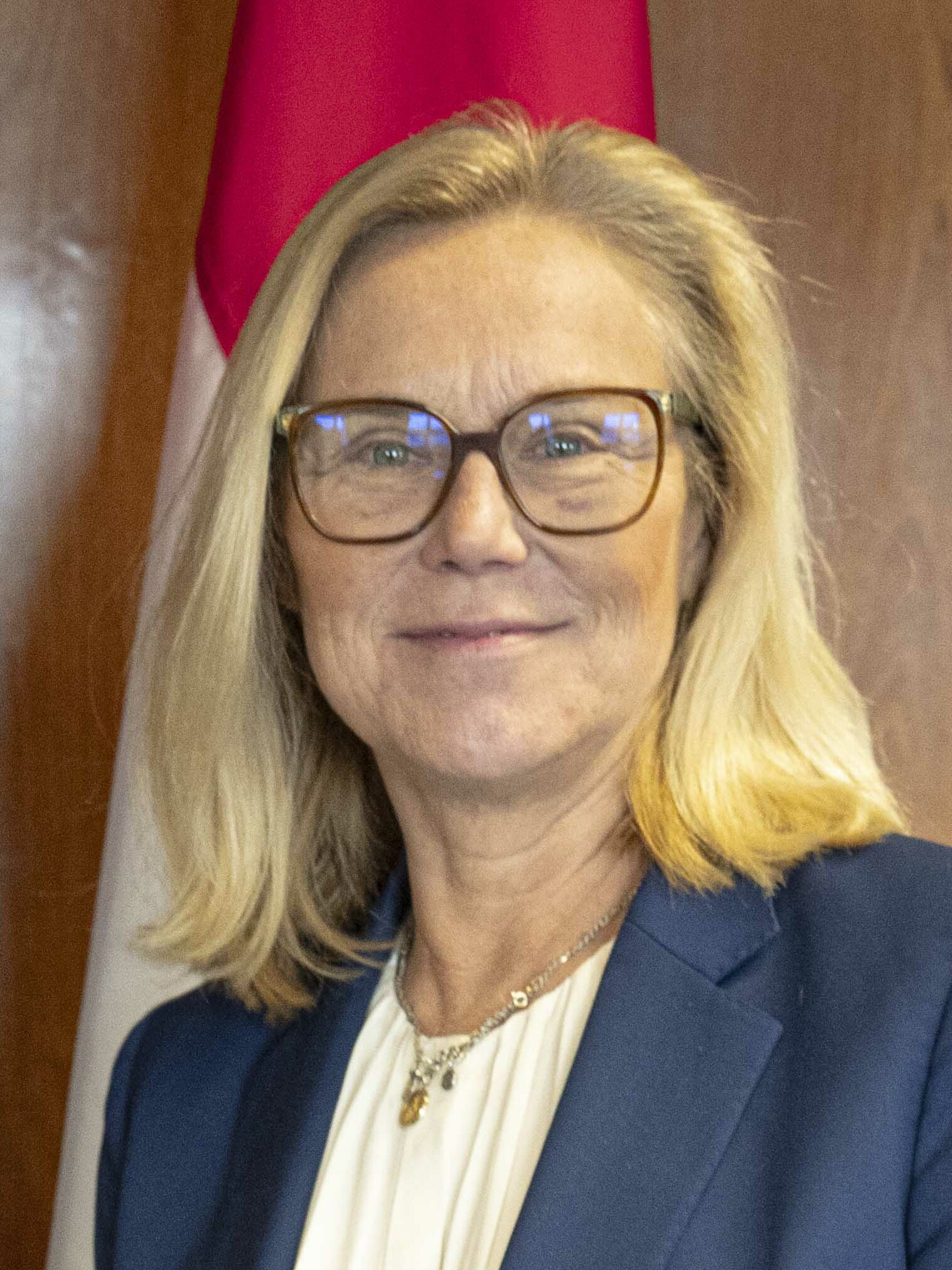
- Incumbent; Sigrid Kaag since 17 January 2025
- Residence: Government House, Jerusalem
- Formation: Oslo Accords; 15 June 1994
- Website: unsco.unmissions.org

The United Nations Special Coordinator for the Middle East Peace Process, formerly known as the United Nations Special Coordinator (UNSCO), "represents the Secretary-General and leads the UN system in all political and diplomatic efforts related to the peace process, including in the Middle East Quartet" and also "coordinates the humanitarian and development work of UN agencies and programmes in the occupied Palestinian territory, in support of the Palestinian Authority and the Palestinian people".

Established in June 1994 following the signing of the Oslo Accords, it sought to facilitate the transition process and to "respond to the needs of the Palestinian people".

== List of United Nations Special Coordinators (for the Middle East Peace Process) ==
- Terje Rød-Larsen, Norway (15 June 1994 – 31 October 1996)
- Chinmaya Gharekhan, India (6 February 1997 – 30 September 1999)
- Terje Rød-Larsen, Norway (1 October 1999 – 31 December 2004)
- Álvaro de Soto, Peru (1 May 2005 – May 2007)
- Michael C. Williams, United Kingdom (15 May 2007 – November 2007)
- Robert Serry, Netherlands (1 December 2007 – 5 February 2015)
- Nickolay Mladenov, Bulgaria (2015–2020)
- Tor Wennesland, Norway (2021–2025)
- Sigrid Kaag, Netherlands (since 2025)

== See also ==
- Israel and the United Nations
- Palestine and the United Nations
